

210001–210100 

|-bgcolor=#fefefe
| 210001 ||  || — || May 2, 2006 || Mount Lemmon || Mount Lemmon Survey || — || align=right | 1.3 km || 
|-id=002 bgcolor=#fefefe
| 210002 ||  || — || May 3, 2006 || Kitt Peak || Spacewatch || — || align=right | 1.3 km || 
|-id=003 bgcolor=#E9E9E9
| 210003 ||  || — || May 2, 2006 || Kitt Peak || Spacewatch || — || align=right | 2.2 km || 
|-id=004 bgcolor=#fefefe
| 210004 ||  || — || May 5, 2006 || Kitt Peak || Spacewatch || V || align=right data-sort-value="0.90" | 900 m || 
|-id=005 bgcolor=#fefefe
| 210005 ||  || — || May 6, 2006 || Kitt Peak || Spacewatch || — || align=right data-sort-value="0.89" | 890 m || 
|-id=006 bgcolor=#fefefe
| 210006 ||  || — || May 2, 2006 || Mount Lemmon || Mount Lemmon Survey || — || align=right | 1.2 km || 
|-id=007 bgcolor=#fefefe
| 210007 ||  || — || May 6, 2006 || Kitt Peak || Spacewatch || — || align=right | 1.1 km || 
|-id=008 bgcolor=#fefefe
| 210008 ||  || — || May 7, 2006 || Mount Lemmon || Mount Lemmon Survey || MAS || align=right data-sort-value="0.88" | 880 m || 
|-id=009 bgcolor=#fefefe
| 210009 ||  || — || May 5, 2006 || Mount Lemmon || Mount Lemmon Survey || V || align=right data-sort-value="0.83" | 830 m || 
|-id=010 bgcolor=#fefefe
| 210010 || 2006 KO || — || May 16, 2006 || Palomar || NEAT || — || align=right | 1.1 km || 
|-id=011 bgcolor=#fefefe
| 210011 || 2006 KT || — || May 18, 2006 || Palomar || NEAT || MAS || align=right | 1.1 km || 
|-id=012 bgcolor=#FFC2E0
| 210012 ||  || — || May 21, 2006 || Catalina || CSS || AMO +1km || align=right | 1.6 km || 
|-id=013 bgcolor=#fefefe
| 210013 ||  || — || May 19, 2006 || Mount Lemmon || Mount Lemmon Survey || V || align=right | 1.1 km || 
|-id=014 bgcolor=#fefefe
| 210014 ||  || — || May 19, 2006 || Mount Lemmon || Mount Lemmon Survey || V || align=right | 1.0 km || 
|-id=015 bgcolor=#fefefe
| 210015 ||  || — || May 19, 2006 || Palomar || NEAT || — || align=right | 1.1 km || 
|-id=016 bgcolor=#fefefe
| 210016 ||  || — || May 19, 2006 || Mount Lemmon || Mount Lemmon Survey || — || align=right | 1.3 km || 
|-id=017 bgcolor=#fefefe
| 210017 ||  || — || May 20, 2006 || Kitt Peak || Spacewatch || MAS || align=right data-sort-value="0.90" | 900 m || 
|-id=018 bgcolor=#fefefe
| 210018 ||  || — || May 20, 2006 || Anderson Mesa || LONEOS || — || align=right | 1.1 km || 
|-id=019 bgcolor=#E9E9E9
| 210019 ||  || — || May 19, 2006 || Mount Lemmon || Mount Lemmon Survey || — || align=right | 2.6 km || 
|-id=020 bgcolor=#E9E9E9
| 210020 ||  || — || May 20, 2006 || Kitt Peak || Spacewatch || — || align=right | 2.7 km || 
|-id=021 bgcolor=#d6d6d6
| 210021 ||  || — || May 21, 2006 || Kitt Peak || Spacewatch || KOR || align=right | 1.8 km || 
|-id=022 bgcolor=#fefefe
| 210022 ||  || — || May 22, 2006 || Kitt Peak || Spacewatch || V || align=right data-sort-value="0.99" | 990 m || 
|-id=023 bgcolor=#fefefe
| 210023 ||  || — || May 23, 2006 || Catalina || CSS || — || align=right | 1.0 km || 
|-id=024 bgcolor=#fefefe
| 210024 ||  || — || May 24, 2006 || Mount Lemmon || Mount Lemmon Survey || — || align=right | 1.2 km || 
|-id=025 bgcolor=#fefefe
| 210025 ||  || — || May 25, 2006 || Kitt Peak || Spacewatch || — || align=right data-sort-value="0.97" | 970 m || 
|-id=026 bgcolor=#fefefe
| 210026 ||  || — || May 25, 2006 || Kitt Peak || Spacewatch || FLO || align=right data-sort-value="0.83" | 830 m || 
|-id=027 bgcolor=#fefefe
| 210027 ||  || — || May 22, 2006 || Siding Spring || SSS || FLO || align=right | 1.0 km || 
|-id=028 bgcolor=#E9E9E9
| 210028 ||  || — || May 27, 2006 || Catalina || CSS || — || align=right | 3.0 km || 
|-id=029 bgcolor=#E9E9E9
| 210029 ||  || — || June 5, 2006 || Socorro || LINEAR || — || align=right | 1.5 km || 
|-id=030 bgcolor=#fefefe
| 210030 Taoyuan ||  ||  || June 24, 2006 || Lulin Observatory || T.-C. Yang, Q.-z. Ye || V || align=right data-sort-value="0.88" | 880 m || 
|-id=031 bgcolor=#fefefe
| 210031 ||  || — || June 30, 2006 || Lulin Observatory || Q.-z. Ye || — || align=right | 1.1 km || 
|-id=032 bgcolor=#E9E9E9
| 210032 Enricocastellani || 2006 OC ||  || July 16, 2006 || Vallemare di Borbona || V. S. Casulli || — || align=right | 2.6 km || 
|-id=033 bgcolor=#fefefe
| 210033 ||  || — || July 17, 2006 || Reedy Creek || J. Broughton || — || align=right | 1.3 km || 
|-id=034 bgcolor=#E9E9E9
| 210034 ||  || — || July 21, 2006 || Mount Lemmon || Mount Lemmon Survey || — || align=right | 1.6 km || 
|-id=035 bgcolor=#E9E9E9
| 210035 Jungli ||  ||  || July 18, 2006 || Lulin Observatory || H.-C. Lin, Q.-z. Ye || — || align=right | 2.6 km || 
|-id=036 bgcolor=#E9E9E9
| 210036 ||  || — || July 20, 2006 || Palomar || NEAT || — || align=right | 2.2 km || 
|-id=037 bgcolor=#fefefe
| 210037 ||  || — || July 20, 2006 || Palomar || NEAT || NYS || align=right data-sort-value="0.91" | 910 m || 
|-id=038 bgcolor=#d6d6d6
| 210038 ||  || — || July 24, 2006 || Hibiscus || S. F. Hönig || — || align=right | 3.6 km || 
|-id=039 bgcolor=#d6d6d6
| 210039 ||  || — || July 21, 2006 || Palomar || NEAT || — || align=right | 6.8 km || 
|-id=040 bgcolor=#fefefe
| 210040 ||  || — || July 21, 2006 || Socorro || LINEAR || MAS || align=right | 1.5 km || 
|-id=041 bgcolor=#d6d6d6
| 210041 ||  || — || July 20, 2006 || Palomar || NEAT || — || align=right | 4.2 km || 
|-id=042 bgcolor=#E9E9E9
| 210042 ||  || — || July 20, 2006 || Siding Spring || SSS || — || align=right | 2.1 km || 
|-id=043 bgcolor=#d6d6d6
| 210043 ||  || — || July 22, 2006 || Mount Lemmon || Mount Lemmon Survey || — || align=right | 3.0 km || 
|-id=044 bgcolor=#d6d6d6
| 210044 ||  || — || July 21, 2006 || Mount Lemmon || Mount Lemmon Survey || — || align=right | 3.1 km || 
|-id=045 bgcolor=#E9E9E9
| 210045 ||  || — || August 12, 2006 || Palomar || NEAT || — || align=right | 1.1 km || 
|-id=046 bgcolor=#E9E9E9
| 210046 ||  || — || August 12, 2006 || Palomar || NEAT || — || align=right | 1.6 km || 
|-id=047 bgcolor=#d6d6d6
| 210047 ||  || — || August 12, 2006 || Palomar || NEAT || EOS || align=right | 3.0 km || 
|-id=048 bgcolor=#E9E9E9
| 210048 ||  || — || August 13, 2006 || Palomar || NEAT || — || align=right | 1.2 km || 
|-id=049 bgcolor=#d6d6d6
| 210049 ||  || — || August 13, 2006 || Palomar || NEAT || 3:2 || align=right | 5.2 km || 
|-id=050 bgcolor=#fefefe
| 210050 ||  || — || August 15, 2006 || Palomar || NEAT || — || align=right | 1.8 km || 
|-id=051 bgcolor=#E9E9E9
| 210051 ||  || — || August 13, 2006 || Palomar || NEAT || — || align=right | 2.6 km || 
|-id=052 bgcolor=#fefefe
| 210052 ||  || — || August 15, 2006 || Palomar || NEAT || — || align=right | 1.2 km || 
|-id=053 bgcolor=#d6d6d6
| 210053 ||  || — || August 15, 2006 || Palomar || NEAT || 628 || align=right | 2.8 km || 
|-id=054 bgcolor=#E9E9E9
| 210054 ||  || — || August 15, 2006 || Palomar || NEAT || HEN || align=right | 1.7 km || 
|-id=055 bgcolor=#fefefe
| 210055 ||  || — || August 12, 2006 || Palomar || NEAT || EUT || align=right | 1.0 km || 
|-id=056 bgcolor=#E9E9E9
| 210056 ||  || — || August 12, 2006 || Palomar || NEAT || — || align=right | 2.0 km || 
|-id=057 bgcolor=#E9E9E9
| 210057 ||  || — || August 15, 2006 || Palomar || NEAT || — || align=right | 3.6 km || 
|-id=058 bgcolor=#E9E9E9
| 210058 ||  || — || August 15, 2006 || Palomar || NEAT || EUN || align=right | 1.6 km || 
|-id=059 bgcolor=#E9E9E9
| 210059 ||  || — || August 12, 2006 || Palomar || NEAT || — || align=right | 3.1 km || 
|-id=060 bgcolor=#fefefe
| 210060 ||  || — || August 13, 2006 || Palomar || NEAT || MAS || align=right data-sort-value="0.94" | 940 m || 
|-id=061 bgcolor=#d6d6d6
| 210061 ||  || — || August 14, 2006 || Palomar || NEAT || — || align=right | 4.9 km || 
|-id=062 bgcolor=#d6d6d6
| 210062 ||  || — || August 14, 2006 || Palomar || NEAT || — || align=right | 5.6 km || 
|-id=063 bgcolor=#E9E9E9
| 210063 ||  || — || August 13, 2006 || Palomar || NEAT || — || align=right | 3.4 km || 
|-id=064 bgcolor=#d6d6d6
| 210064 ||  || — || August 17, 2006 || Palomar || NEAT || — || align=right | 3.3 km || 
|-id=065 bgcolor=#fefefe
| 210065 ||  || — || August 17, 2006 || Palomar || NEAT || — || align=right | 1.1 km || 
|-id=066 bgcolor=#E9E9E9
| 210066 ||  || — || August 17, 2006 || Palomar || NEAT || — || align=right | 5.0 km || 
|-id=067 bgcolor=#d6d6d6
| 210067 ||  || — || August 17, 2006 || Palomar || NEAT || VER || align=right | 4.8 km || 
|-id=068 bgcolor=#E9E9E9
| 210068 ||  || — || August 18, 2006 || Kitt Peak || Spacewatch || EUN || align=right | 2.0 km || 
|-id=069 bgcolor=#E9E9E9
| 210069 ||  || — || August 19, 2006 || Kitt Peak || Spacewatch || — || align=right | 2.9 km || 
|-id=070 bgcolor=#d6d6d6
| 210070 Robertcapa ||  ||  || August 19, 2006 || Piszkéstető || K. Sárneczky, Z. Kuli || — || align=right | 3.0 km || 
|-id=071 bgcolor=#E9E9E9
| 210071 ||  || — || August 16, 2006 || Siding Spring || SSS || — || align=right | 2.1 km || 
|-id=072 bgcolor=#E9E9E9
| 210072 ||  || — || August 17, 2006 || Palomar || NEAT || — || align=right | 2.9 km || 
|-id=073 bgcolor=#E9E9E9
| 210073 ||  || — || August 17, 2006 || Palomar || NEAT || — || align=right | 2.2 km || 
|-id=074 bgcolor=#E9E9E9
| 210074 ||  || — || August 19, 2006 || Anderson Mesa || LONEOS || — || align=right | 3.6 km || 
|-id=075 bgcolor=#d6d6d6
| 210075 ||  || — || August 19, 2006 || Palomar || NEAT || MEL || align=right | 5.1 km || 
|-id=076 bgcolor=#d6d6d6
| 210076 ||  || — || August 17, 2006 || Palomar || NEAT || — || align=right | 5.1 km || 
|-id=077 bgcolor=#E9E9E9
| 210077 ||  || — || August 18, 2006 || Anderson Mesa || LONEOS || PAD || align=right | 3.6 km || 
|-id=078 bgcolor=#E9E9E9
| 210078 ||  || — || August 19, 2006 || Kitt Peak || Spacewatch || HEN || align=right | 1.6 km || 
|-id=079 bgcolor=#fefefe
| 210079 ||  || — || August 20, 2006 || Palomar || NEAT || NYS || align=right | 1.0 km || 
|-id=080 bgcolor=#fefefe
| 210080 ||  || — || August 17, 2006 || Palomar || NEAT || CHL || align=right | 2.9 km || 
|-id=081 bgcolor=#E9E9E9
| 210081 ||  || — || August 22, 2006 || Palomar || NEAT || — || align=right | 3.6 km || 
|-id=082 bgcolor=#E9E9E9
| 210082 ||  || — || August 17, 2006 || Palomar || NEAT || — || align=right | 3.3 km || 
|-id=083 bgcolor=#E9E9E9
| 210083 ||  || — || August 18, 2006 || Anderson Mesa || LONEOS || — || align=right | 2.9 km || 
|-id=084 bgcolor=#E9E9E9
| 210084 ||  || — || August 19, 2006 || Palomar || NEAT || — || align=right | 5.0 km || 
|-id=085 bgcolor=#d6d6d6
| 210085 ||  || — || August 19, 2006 || Kitt Peak || Spacewatch || — || align=right | 5.6 km || 
|-id=086 bgcolor=#E9E9E9
| 210086 ||  || — || August 23, 2006 || Socorro || LINEAR || GEF || align=right | 1.8 km || 
|-id=087 bgcolor=#d6d6d6
| 210087 ||  || — || August 22, 2006 || Palomar || NEAT || 3:2 || align=right | 5.1 km || 
|-id=088 bgcolor=#d6d6d6
| 210088 ||  || — || August 27, 2006 || Kitt Peak || Spacewatch || KOR || align=right | 1.6 km || 
|-id=089 bgcolor=#E9E9E9
| 210089 ||  || — || August 21, 2006 || Kitt Peak || Spacewatch || MRX || align=right | 1.6 km || 
|-id=090 bgcolor=#E9E9E9
| 210090 ||  || — || August 21, 2006 || Kitt Peak || Spacewatch || — || align=right | 1.6 km || 
|-id=091 bgcolor=#d6d6d6
| 210091 ||  || — || August 24, 2006 || Palomar || NEAT || — || align=right | 4.4 km || 
|-id=092 bgcolor=#E9E9E9
| 210092 ||  || — || August 24, 2006 || Palomar || NEAT || AEO || align=right | 1.6 km || 
|-id=093 bgcolor=#E9E9E9
| 210093 ||  || — || August 25, 2006 || Socorro || LINEAR || — || align=right | 2.7 km || 
|-id=094 bgcolor=#d6d6d6
| 210094 ||  || — || August 25, 2006 || Socorro || LINEAR || — || align=right | 4.3 km || 
|-id=095 bgcolor=#d6d6d6
| 210095 ||  || — || August 27, 2006 || Kitt Peak || Spacewatch || — || align=right | 3.5 km || 
|-id=096 bgcolor=#d6d6d6
| 210096 ||  || — || August 16, 2006 || Palomar || NEAT || CHA || align=right | 3.5 km || 
|-id=097 bgcolor=#d6d6d6
| 210097 ||  || — || August 18, 2006 || Kitt Peak || Spacewatch || KOR || align=right | 1.9 km || 
|-id=098 bgcolor=#d6d6d6
| 210098 ||  || — || August 28, 2006 || Catalina || CSS || KOR || align=right | 2.0 km || 
|-id=099 bgcolor=#E9E9E9
| 210099 ||  || — || August 27, 2006 || Anderson Mesa || LONEOS || — || align=right | 1.6 km || 
|-id=100 bgcolor=#E9E9E9
| 210100 ||  || — || August 27, 2006 || Anderson Mesa || LONEOS || MAR || align=right | 1.3 km || 
|}

210101–210200 

|-bgcolor=#d6d6d6
| 210101 ||  || — || August 27, 2006 || Anderson Mesa || LONEOS || EOS || align=right | 2.3 km || 
|-id=102 bgcolor=#d6d6d6
| 210102 ||  || — || August 27, 2006 || Anderson Mesa || LONEOS || — || align=right | 5.9 km || 
|-id=103 bgcolor=#d6d6d6
| 210103 ||  || — || August 29, 2006 || Catalina || CSS || — || align=right | 4.5 km || 
|-id=104 bgcolor=#d6d6d6
| 210104 ||  || — || August 24, 2006 || Palomar || NEAT || — || align=right | 4.0 km || 
|-id=105 bgcolor=#d6d6d6
| 210105 ||  || — || August 29, 2006 || Anderson Mesa || LONEOS || ALA || align=right | 7.6 km || 
|-id=106 bgcolor=#E9E9E9
| 210106 ||  || — || August 19, 2006 || Anderson Mesa || LONEOS || — || align=right | 3.7 km || 
|-id=107 bgcolor=#d6d6d6
| 210107 Pistoletto ||  ||  || August 30, 2006 || Vallemare di Borbona || V. S. Casulli || — || align=right | 3.2 km || 
|-id=108 bgcolor=#d6d6d6
| 210108 ||  || — || August 18, 2006 || Palomar || NEAT || — || align=right | 4.6 km || 
|-id=109 bgcolor=#d6d6d6
| 210109 ||  || — || August 19, 2006 || Kitt Peak || Spacewatch || — || align=right | 3.4 km || 
|-id=110 bgcolor=#E9E9E9
| 210110 ||  || — || August 19, 2006 || Kitt Peak || Spacewatch || AGN || align=right | 1.7 km || 
|-id=111 bgcolor=#d6d6d6
| 210111 ||  || — || August 29, 2006 || Catalina || CSS || — || align=right | 4.7 km || 
|-id=112 bgcolor=#E9E9E9
| 210112 ||  || — || August 30, 2006 || Anderson Mesa || LONEOS || HOF || align=right | 4.2 km || 
|-id=113 bgcolor=#d6d6d6
| 210113 ||  || — || August 28, 2006 || Anderson Mesa || LONEOS || URS || align=right | 6.0 km || 
|-id=114 bgcolor=#E9E9E9
| 210114 ||  || — || September 9, 2006 || Palomar || NEAT || — || align=right | 4.0 km || 
|-id=115 bgcolor=#d6d6d6
| 210115 ||  || — || September 14, 2006 || Catalina || CSS || LIX || align=right | 6.4 km || 
|-id=116 bgcolor=#d6d6d6
| 210116 ||  || — || September 14, 2006 || Palomar || NEAT || — || align=right | 4.1 km || 
|-id=117 bgcolor=#d6d6d6
| 210117 ||  || — || September 14, 2006 || Kitt Peak || Spacewatch || KOR || align=right | 2.2 km || 
|-id=118 bgcolor=#E9E9E9
| 210118 ||  || — || September 15, 2006 || Socorro || LINEAR || AEO || align=right | 1.6 km || 
|-id=119 bgcolor=#d6d6d6
| 210119 ||  || — || September 15, 2006 || Kitt Peak || Spacewatch || THM || align=right | 4.3 km || 
|-id=120 bgcolor=#d6d6d6
| 210120 ||  || — || September 12, 2006 || Catalina || CSS || — || align=right | 4.3 km || 
|-id=121 bgcolor=#E9E9E9
| 210121 ||  || — || September 12, 2006 || Catalina || CSS || — || align=right | 1.6 km || 
|-id=122 bgcolor=#d6d6d6
| 210122 ||  || — || September 13, 2006 || Palomar || NEAT || EOS || align=right | 3.5 km || 
|-id=123 bgcolor=#d6d6d6
| 210123 ||  || — || September 14, 2006 || Kitt Peak || Spacewatch || — || align=right | 2.6 km || 
|-id=124 bgcolor=#E9E9E9
| 210124 ||  || — || September 14, 2006 || Kitt Peak || Spacewatch || — || align=right | 2.5 km || 
|-id=125 bgcolor=#E9E9E9
| 210125 ||  || — || September 15, 2006 || Kitt Peak || Spacewatch || — || align=right | 2.9 km || 
|-id=126 bgcolor=#E9E9E9
| 210126 ||  || — || September 14, 2006 || Catalina || CSS || — || align=right | 2.7 km || 
|-id=127 bgcolor=#E9E9E9
| 210127 ||  || — || September 15, 2006 || Kitt Peak || Spacewatch || — || align=right | 2.2 km || 
|-id=128 bgcolor=#d6d6d6
| 210128 ||  || — || September 15, 2006 || Kitt Peak || Spacewatch || — || align=right | 4.3 km || 
|-id=129 bgcolor=#d6d6d6
| 210129 ||  || — || September 15, 2006 || Kitt Peak || Spacewatch || — || align=right | 3.0 km || 
|-id=130 bgcolor=#d6d6d6
| 210130 ||  || — || September 15, 2006 || Kitt Peak || Spacewatch || — || align=right | 4.1 km || 
|-id=131 bgcolor=#d6d6d6
| 210131 ||  || — || September 15, 2006 || Kitt Peak || Spacewatch || — || align=right | 3.6 km || 
|-id=132 bgcolor=#d6d6d6
| 210132 ||  || — || September 15, 2006 || Kitt Peak || Spacewatch || — || align=right | 3.4 km || 
|-id=133 bgcolor=#d6d6d6
| 210133 ||  || — || September 15, 2006 || Kitt Peak || Spacewatch || — || align=right | 5.2 km || 
|-id=134 bgcolor=#E9E9E9
| 210134 ||  || — || September 15, 2006 || Kitt Peak || Spacewatch || — || align=right | 1.9 km || 
|-id=135 bgcolor=#d6d6d6
| 210135 ||  || — || September 15, 2006 || Kitt Peak || Spacewatch || KOR || align=right | 1.7 km || 
|-id=136 bgcolor=#E9E9E9
| 210136 || 2006 ST || — || September 16, 2006 || Goodricke-Pigott || R. A. Tucker || — || align=right | 1.7 km || 
|-id=137 bgcolor=#d6d6d6
| 210137 ||  || — || September 16, 2006 || Anderson Mesa || LONEOS || — || align=right | 5.4 km || 
|-id=138 bgcolor=#E9E9E9
| 210138 ||  || — || September 18, 2006 || 7300 Observatory || W. K. Y. Yeung || MRX || align=right | 1.5 km || 
|-id=139 bgcolor=#d6d6d6
| 210139 ||  || — || September 17, 2006 || Catalina || CSS || TEL || align=right | 2.2 km || 
|-id=140 bgcolor=#E9E9E9
| 210140 ||  || — || September 18, 2006 || Catalina || CSS || — || align=right | 1.9 km || 
|-id=141 bgcolor=#d6d6d6
| 210141 ||  || — || September 17, 2006 || Anderson Mesa || LONEOS || — || align=right | 3.8 km || 
|-id=142 bgcolor=#E9E9E9
| 210142 ||  || — || September 18, 2006 || Kitt Peak || Spacewatch || — || align=right | 1.6 km || 
|-id=143 bgcolor=#d6d6d6
| 210143 ||  || — || September 18, 2006 || Catalina || CSS || — || align=right | 4.5 km || 
|-id=144 bgcolor=#d6d6d6
| 210144 ||  || — || September 18, 2006 || Calvin-Rehoboth || Calvin–Rehoboth Obs. || — || align=right | 4.8 km || 
|-id=145 bgcolor=#d6d6d6
| 210145 ||  || — || September 16, 2006 || Catalina || CSS || — || align=right | 5.1 km || 
|-id=146 bgcolor=#d6d6d6
| 210146 ||  || — || September 18, 2006 || Catalina || CSS || — || align=right | 4.4 km || 
|-id=147 bgcolor=#d6d6d6
| 210147 Zalgiris ||  ||  || September 21, 2006 || Moletai || K. Černis, J. Zdanavičius || — || align=right | 3.7 km || 
|-id=148 bgcolor=#d6d6d6
| 210148 ||  || — || September 19, 2006 || Kitt Peak || Spacewatch || — || align=right | 3.2 km || 
|-id=149 bgcolor=#d6d6d6
| 210149 ||  || — || September 19, 2006 || Catalina || CSS || HIL3:2 || align=right | 8.4 km || 
|-id=150 bgcolor=#d6d6d6
| 210150 ||  || — || September 19, 2006 || Catalina || CSS || ALA || align=right | 5.5 km || 
|-id=151 bgcolor=#d6d6d6
| 210151 ||  || — || September 22, 2006 || Socorro || LINEAR || — || align=right | 3.9 km || 
|-id=152 bgcolor=#E9E9E9
| 210152 ||  || — || September 17, 2006 || Kitt Peak || Spacewatch || — || align=right | 3.1 km || 
|-id=153 bgcolor=#E9E9E9
| 210153 ||  || — || September 19, 2006 || Anderson Mesa || LONEOS || — || align=right | 3.9 km || 
|-id=154 bgcolor=#E9E9E9
| 210154 ||  || — || September 22, 2006 || Socorro || LINEAR || — || align=right | 2.1 km || 
|-id=155 bgcolor=#E9E9E9
| 210155 ||  || — || September 25, 2006 || Kitt Peak || Spacewatch || EUN || align=right | 1.9 km || 
|-id=156 bgcolor=#d6d6d6
| 210156 ||  || — || September 25, 2006 || Mount Lemmon || Mount Lemmon Survey || — || align=right | 2.9 km || 
|-id=157 bgcolor=#d6d6d6
| 210157 ||  || — || September 24, 2006 || Kitt Peak || Spacewatch || THM || align=right | 3.9 km || 
|-id=158 bgcolor=#d6d6d6
| 210158 ||  || — || September 25, 2006 || Mount Lemmon || Mount Lemmon Survey || — || align=right | 3.1 km || 
|-id=159 bgcolor=#d6d6d6
| 210159 ||  || — || September 24, 2006 || Kanab || E. E. Sheridan || EOS || align=right | 5.9 km || 
|-id=160 bgcolor=#d6d6d6
| 210160 ||  || — || September 18, 2006 || Catalina || CSS || — || align=right | 4.0 km || 
|-id=161 bgcolor=#d6d6d6
| 210161 ||  || — || September 27, 2006 || Kitt Peak || Spacewatch || — || align=right | 6.3 km || 
|-id=162 bgcolor=#E9E9E9
| 210162 ||  || — || September 27, 2006 || Kitt Peak || Spacewatch || — || align=right | 1.2 km || 
|-id=163 bgcolor=#d6d6d6
| 210163 ||  || — || September 27, 2006 || Kitt Peak || Spacewatch || KOR || align=right | 2.1 km || 
|-id=164 bgcolor=#d6d6d6
| 210164 ||  || — || September 27, 2006 || Kitt Peak || Spacewatch || — || align=right | 5.0 km || 
|-id=165 bgcolor=#E9E9E9
| 210165 ||  || — || September 28, 2006 || Kitt Peak || Spacewatch || HOF || align=right | 3.5 km || 
|-id=166 bgcolor=#E9E9E9
| 210166 ||  || — || September 17, 2006 || Apache Point || A. C. Becker || — || align=right | 2.0 km || 
|-id=167 bgcolor=#d6d6d6
| 210167 ||  || — || September 29, 2006 || Apache Point || A. C. Becker || — || align=right | 3.2 km || 
|-id=168 bgcolor=#d6d6d6
| 210168 ||  || — || October 11, 2006 || Kitt Peak || Spacewatch || THM || align=right | 3.7 km || 
|-id=169 bgcolor=#d6d6d6
| 210169 ||  || — || October 11, 2006 || Kitt Peak || Spacewatch || — || align=right | 5.3 km || 
|-id=170 bgcolor=#d6d6d6
| 210170 ||  || — || October 11, 2006 || Kitt Peak || Spacewatch || — || align=right | 5.1 km || 
|-id=171 bgcolor=#d6d6d6
| 210171 ||  || — || October 12, 2006 || Kitt Peak || Spacewatch || VER || align=right | 4.1 km || 
|-id=172 bgcolor=#d6d6d6
| 210172 ||  || — || October 11, 2006 || Palomar || NEAT || — || align=right | 4.2 km || 
|-id=173 bgcolor=#d6d6d6
| 210173 ||  || — || October 13, 2006 || Kitt Peak || Spacewatch || — || align=right | 3.1 km || 
|-id=174 bgcolor=#E9E9E9
| 210174 Vossenkuhl || 2006 US ||  || October 16, 2006 || Wildberg || R. Apitzsch || EUN || align=right | 2.2 km || 
|-id=175 bgcolor=#d6d6d6
| 210175 ||  || — || October 17, 2006 || Mount Lemmon || Mount Lemmon Survey || — || align=right | 3.5 km || 
|-id=176 bgcolor=#d6d6d6
| 210176 ||  || — || October 18, 2006 || Kitt Peak || Spacewatch || — || align=right | 3.5 km || 
|-id=177 bgcolor=#d6d6d6
| 210177 ||  || — || October 19, 2006 || Kitt Peak || Spacewatch || — || align=right | 3.3 km || 
|-id=178 bgcolor=#d6d6d6
| 210178 ||  || — || October 17, 2006 || Kitt Peak || Spacewatch || 7:4 || align=right | 6.9 km || 
|-id=179 bgcolor=#d6d6d6
| 210179 ||  || — || October 19, 2006 || Kitt Peak || Spacewatch || KOR || align=right | 1.6 km || 
|-id=180 bgcolor=#d6d6d6
| 210180 ||  || — || October 19, 2006 || Catalina || CSS || HYG || align=right | 3.4 km || 
|-id=181 bgcolor=#d6d6d6
| 210181 ||  || — || October 21, 2006 || Catalina || CSS || EOS || align=right | 2.7 km || 
|-id=182 bgcolor=#d6d6d6
| 210182 Mazzini ||  ||  || October 26, 2006 || Vallemare di Borbona || V. S. Casulli || — || align=right | 6.9 km || 
|-id=183 bgcolor=#d6d6d6
| 210183 ||  || — || October 27, 2006 || Mount Lemmon || Mount Lemmon Survey || — || align=right | 3.4 km || 
|-id=184 bgcolor=#d6d6d6
| 210184 ||  || — || October 27, 2006 || Kitt Peak || Spacewatch || HIL3:2 || align=right | 8.2 km || 
|-id=185 bgcolor=#d6d6d6
| 210185 ||  || — || October 21, 2006 || Apache Point || A. C. Becker || — || align=right | 3.3 km || 
|-id=186 bgcolor=#d6d6d6
| 210186 ||  || — || November 12, 2006 || Mount Lemmon || Mount Lemmon Survey || HYG || align=right | 3.5 km || 
|-id=187 bgcolor=#d6d6d6
| 210187 ||  || — || November 11, 2006 || Kitt Peak || Spacewatch || 3:2 || align=right | 6.5 km || 
|-id=188 bgcolor=#d6d6d6
| 210188 ||  || — || November 15, 2006 || Kitt Peak || Spacewatch || THM || align=right | 2.6 km || 
|-id=189 bgcolor=#d6d6d6
| 210189 ||  || — || November 9, 2006 || Palomar || NEAT || 7:4 || align=right | 5.1 km || 
|-id=190 bgcolor=#d6d6d6
| 210190 ||  || — || November 18, 2006 || Kitt Peak || Spacewatch || HYG || align=right | 3.7 km || 
|-id=191 bgcolor=#d6d6d6
| 210191 ||  || — || July 22, 2007 || Siding Spring || SSS || Tj (2.93) || align=right | 7.1 km || 
|-id=192 bgcolor=#fefefe
| 210192 ||  || — || August 8, 2007 || Socorro || LINEAR || — || align=right | 1.2 km || 
|-id=193 bgcolor=#fefefe
| 210193 ||  || — || August 9, 2007 || Kitt Peak || Spacewatch || NYS || align=right | 1.0 km || 
|-id=194 bgcolor=#fefefe
| 210194 ||  || — || August 9, 2007 || Socorro || LINEAR || — || align=right | 1.2 km || 
|-id=195 bgcolor=#fefefe
| 210195 ||  || — || August 9, 2007 || Socorro || LINEAR || — || align=right | 1.3 km || 
|-id=196 bgcolor=#fefefe
| 210196 ||  || — || August 9, 2007 || Socorro || LINEAR || NYS || align=right | 1.1 km || 
|-id=197 bgcolor=#fefefe
| 210197 ||  || — || August 10, 2007 || Kitt Peak || Spacewatch || H || align=right data-sort-value="0.92" | 920 m || 
|-id=198 bgcolor=#fefefe
| 210198 ||  || — || August 12, 2007 || Socorro || LINEAR || — || align=right | 1.2 km || 
|-id=199 bgcolor=#fefefe
| 210199 ||  || — || August 12, 2007 || Socorro || LINEAR || NYS || align=right | 1.2 km || 
|-id=200 bgcolor=#E9E9E9
| 210200 ||  || — || August 11, 2007 || Socorro || LINEAR || — || align=right | 2.0 km || 
|}

210201–210300 

|-bgcolor=#d6d6d6
| 210201 ||  || — || August 10, 2007 || Kitt Peak || Spacewatch || KOR || align=right | 1.7 km || 
|-id=202 bgcolor=#E9E9E9
| 210202 ||  || — || August 15, 2007 || Hibiscus || S. F. Hönig, N. Teamo || KAZ || align=right | 1.7 km || 
|-id=203 bgcolor=#fefefe
| 210203 ||  || — || August 11, 2007 || Socorro || LINEAR || — || align=right | 1.5 km || 
|-id=204 bgcolor=#E9E9E9
| 210204 ||  || — || August 11, 2007 || Socorro || LINEAR || — || align=right | 2.1 km || 
|-id=205 bgcolor=#fefefe
| 210205 ||  || — || August 13, 2007 || Socorro || LINEAR || — || align=right | 1.4 km || 
|-id=206 bgcolor=#fefefe
| 210206 ||  || — || August 15, 2007 || OAM || OAM Obs. || FLO || align=right data-sort-value="0.94" | 940 m || 
|-id=207 bgcolor=#fefefe
| 210207 || 2007 QV || — || August 17, 2007 || Bisei SG Center || BATTeRS || FLO || align=right data-sort-value="0.81" | 810 m || 
|-id=208 bgcolor=#fefefe
| 210208 ||  || — || August 21, 2007 || Anderson Mesa || LONEOS || NYS || align=right data-sort-value="0.80" | 800 m || 
|-id=209 bgcolor=#fefefe
| 210209 ||  || — || August 21, 2007 || Anderson Mesa || LONEOS || MAS || align=right | 1.6 km || 
|-id=210 bgcolor=#fefefe
| 210210 Songjian ||  ||  || August 16, 2007 || XuYi || PMO NEO || — || align=right data-sort-value="0.72" | 720 m || 
|-id=211 bgcolor=#d6d6d6
| 210211 ||  || — || August 24, 2007 || Kitt Peak || Spacewatch || — || align=right | 3.0 km || 
|-id=212 bgcolor=#fefefe
| 210212 ||  || — || September 4, 2007 || RAS || A. Lowe || — || align=right data-sort-value="0.93" | 930 m || 
|-id=213 bgcolor=#E9E9E9
| 210213 Hasler-Gloor ||  ||  || September 11, 2007 || Winterthur || M. Griesser || JUN || align=right | 1.1 km || 
|-id=214 bgcolor=#E9E9E9
| 210214 ||  || — || September 4, 2007 || Catalina || CSS || — || align=right | 1.9 km || 
|-id=215 bgcolor=#E9E9E9
| 210215 ||  || — || September 5, 2007 || Anderson Mesa || LONEOS || GAL || align=right | 4.3 km || 
|-id=216 bgcolor=#fefefe
| 210216 ||  || — || September 5, 2007 || Catalina || CSS || V || align=right data-sort-value="0.94" | 940 m || 
|-id=217 bgcolor=#fefefe
| 210217 ||  || — || September 5, 2007 || Catalina || CSS || — || align=right | 1.3 km || 
|-id=218 bgcolor=#fefefe
| 210218 ||  || — || September 8, 2007 || Anderson Mesa || LONEOS || — || align=right | 1.3 km || 
|-id=219 bgcolor=#E9E9E9
| 210219 ||  || — || September 9, 2007 || Mount Lemmon || Mount Lemmon Survey || — || align=right data-sort-value="0.79" | 790 m || 
|-id=220 bgcolor=#E9E9E9
| 210220 ||  || — || September 9, 2007 || Kitt Peak || Spacewatch || — || align=right | 1.9 km || 
|-id=221 bgcolor=#fefefe
| 210221 ||  || — || September 10, 2007 || Catalina || CSS || NYS || align=right data-sort-value="0.82" | 820 m || 
|-id=222 bgcolor=#E9E9E9
| 210222 ||  || — || September 10, 2007 || Mount Lemmon || Mount Lemmon Survey || HEN || align=right | 1.5 km || 
|-id=223 bgcolor=#fefefe
| 210223 ||  || — || September 10, 2007 || Kitt Peak || Spacewatch || — || align=right data-sort-value="0.92" | 920 m || 
|-id=224 bgcolor=#fefefe
| 210224 ||  || — || September 10, 2007 || Kitt Peak || Spacewatch || — || align=right data-sort-value="0.95" | 950 m || 
|-id=225 bgcolor=#fefefe
| 210225 ||  || — || September 10, 2007 || Mount Lemmon || Mount Lemmon Survey || MAS || align=right data-sort-value="0.92" | 920 m || 
|-id=226 bgcolor=#E9E9E9
| 210226 ||  || — || September 10, 2007 || Kitt Peak || Spacewatch || — || align=right | 3.4 km || 
|-id=227 bgcolor=#fefefe
| 210227 ||  || — || September 11, 2007 || Catalina || CSS || — || align=right | 1.2 km || 
|-id=228 bgcolor=#fefefe
| 210228 ||  || — || September 11, 2007 || Kitt Peak || Spacewatch || FLO || align=right data-sort-value="0.74" | 740 m || 
|-id=229 bgcolor=#fefefe
| 210229 ||  || — || September 11, 2007 || Kitt Peak || Spacewatch || V || align=right data-sort-value="0.89" | 890 m || 
|-id=230 bgcolor=#fefefe
| 210230 Linyuanpei ||  ||  || September 11, 2007 || XuYi || PMO NEO || V || align=right | 1.2 km || 
|-id=231 bgcolor=#fefefe
| 210231 Wangdemin ||  ||  || September 11, 2007 || XuYi || PMO NEO || — || align=right | 1.2 km || 
|-id=232 bgcolor=#E9E9E9
| 210232 Zhangjinqiu ||  ||  || September 11, 2007 || XuYi || PMO NEO || — || align=right | 1.5 km || 
|-id=233 bgcolor=#fefefe
| 210233 ||  || — || September 12, 2007 || Mount Lemmon || Mount Lemmon Survey || NYS || align=right | 1.1 km || 
|-id=234 bgcolor=#d6d6d6
| 210234 ||  || — || September 14, 2007 || Anderson Mesa || LONEOS || — || align=right | 4.2 km || 
|-id=235 bgcolor=#d6d6d6
| 210235 ||  || — || September 13, 2007 || Socorro || LINEAR || TIR || align=right | 6.5 km || 
|-id=236 bgcolor=#fefefe
| 210236 ||  || — || September 15, 2007 || Socorro || LINEAR || MAS || align=right | 1.4 km || 
|-id=237 bgcolor=#C2FFFF
| 210237 ||  || — || September 10, 2007 || Catalina || CSS || L4ERY || align=right | 17 km || 
|-id=238 bgcolor=#fefefe
| 210238 ||  || — || September 10, 2007 || Kitt Peak || Spacewatch || — || align=right | 1.1 km || 
|-id=239 bgcolor=#E9E9E9
| 210239 ||  || — || September 10, 2007 || Kitt Peak || Spacewatch || — || align=right | 2.6 km || 
|-id=240 bgcolor=#E9E9E9
| 210240 ||  || — || September 11, 2007 || Catalina || CSS || — || align=right | 3.1 km || 
|-id=241 bgcolor=#fefefe
| 210241 ||  || — || September 12, 2007 || Kitt Peak || Spacewatch || — || align=right data-sort-value="0.95" | 950 m || 
|-id=242 bgcolor=#d6d6d6
| 210242 ||  || — || September 13, 2007 || Kitt Peak || Spacewatch || THM || align=right | 2.2 km || 
|-id=243 bgcolor=#fefefe
| 210243 ||  || — || September 9, 2007 || Kitt Peak || Spacewatch || — || align=right | 1.0 km || 
|-id=244 bgcolor=#fefefe
| 210244 ||  || — || September 10, 2007 || Kitt Peak || Spacewatch || — || align=right | 2.8 km || 
|-id=245 bgcolor=#fefefe
| 210245 Castets ||  ||  || September 13, 2007 || Pic du Midi || Pic du Midi Obs. || NYS || align=right | 1.0 km || 
|-id=246 bgcolor=#E9E9E9
| 210246 ||  || — || September 12, 2007 || Catalina || CSS || — || align=right | 3.6 km || 
|-id=247 bgcolor=#fefefe
| 210247 ||  || — || September 12, 2007 || Catalina || CSS || — || align=right | 1.4 km || 
|-id=248 bgcolor=#fefefe
| 210248 ||  || — || September 12, 2007 || Anderson Mesa || LONEOS || NYS || align=right data-sort-value="0.91" | 910 m || 
|-id=249 bgcolor=#E9E9E9
| 210249 ||  || — || September 10, 2007 || Catalina || CSS || MAR || align=right | 1.8 km || 
|-id=250 bgcolor=#fefefe
| 210250 ||  || — || September 15, 2007 || Socorro || LINEAR || MAS || align=right | 1.2 km || 
|-id=251 bgcolor=#E9E9E9
| 210251 ||  || — || September 13, 2007 || Catalina || CSS || HNS || align=right | 1.9 km || 
|-id=252 bgcolor=#d6d6d6
| 210252 ||  || — || September 14, 2007 || Kitt Peak || Spacewatch || — || align=right | 3.0 km || 
|-id=253 bgcolor=#E9E9E9
| 210253 ||  || — || September 15, 2007 || Mount Lemmon || Mount Lemmon Survey || AST || align=right | 2.4 km || 
|-id=254 bgcolor=#E9E9E9
| 210254 ||  || — || September 13, 2007 || Mount Lemmon || Mount Lemmon Survey || — || align=right | 2.0 km || 
|-id=255 bgcolor=#E9E9E9
| 210255 ||  || — || September 9, 2007 || Mount Lemmon || Mount Lemmon Survey || — || align=right | 1.7 km || 
|-id=256 bgcolor=#d6d6d6
| 210256 ||  || — || September 11, 2007 || Mount Lemmon || Mount Lemmon Survey || KOR || align=right | 1.3 km || 
|-id=257 bgcolor=#fefefe
| 210257 ||  || — || September 13, 2007 || Mount Lemmon || Mount Lemmon Survey || MAS || align=right | 1.1 km || 
|-id=258 bgcolor=#d6d6d6
| 210258 ||  || — || September 14, 2007 || Mount Lemmon || Mount Lemmon Survey || — || align=right | 3.4 km || 
|-id=259 bgcolor=#d6d6d6
| 210259 ||  || — || September 10, 2007 || Mount Lemmon || Mount Lemmon Survey || — || align=right | 3.4 km || 
|-id=260 bgcolor=#E9E9E9
| 210260 ||  || — || September 14, 2007 || Mount Lemmon || Mount Lemmon Survey || — || align=right | 2.4 km || 
|-id=261 bgcolor=#E9E9E9
| 210261 ||  || — || September 12, 2007 || Mount Lemmon || Mount Lemmon Survey || AST || align=right | 1.8 km || 
|-id=262 bgcolor=#fefefe
| 210262 ||  || — || September 14, 2007 || Mount Lemmon || Mount Lemmon Survey || NYS || align=right data-sort-value="0.83" | 830 m || 
|-id=263 bgcolor=#E9E9E9
| 210263 ||  || — || September 11, 2007 || Kitt Peak || Spacewatch || HOF || align=right | 4.1 km || 
|-id=264 bgcolor=#fefefe
| 210264 ||  || — || September 16, 2007 || Socorro || LINEAR || NYS || align=right | 1.1 km || 
|-id=265 bgcolor=#E9E9E9
| 210265 ||  || — || September 18, 2007 || Socorro || LINEAR || MRX || align=right | 1.8 km || 
|-id=266 bgcolor=#fefefe
| 210266 ||  || — || September 21, 2007 || Socorro || LINEAR || — || align=right | 1.1 km || 
|-id=267 bgcolor=#fefefe
| 210267 ||  || — || September 30, 2007 || Kitt Peak || Spacewatch || — || align=right data-sort-value="0.99" | 990 m || 
|-id=268 bgcolor=#fefefe
| 210268 ||  || — || September 18, 2007 || Anderson Mesa || LONEOS || V || align=right data-sort-value="0.92" | 920 m || 
|-id=269 bgcolor=#d6d6d6
| 210269 ||  || — || September 26, 2007 || Mount Lemmon || Mount Lemmon Survey || — || align=right | 3.4 km || 
|-id=270 bgcolor=#d6d6d6
| 210270 ||  || — || October 4, 2007 || Kitt Peak || Spacewatch || — || align=right | 3.2 km || 
|-id=271 bgcolor=#E9E9E9
| 210271 Samarkand ||  ||  || October 2, 2007 || Majdanak Obs. || B. Khafizov, A. Sergeyev || — || align=right | 1.5 km || 
|-id=272 bgcolor=#fefefe
| 210272 ||  || — || October 7, 2007 || OAM || OAM Obs. || — || align=right | 1.3 km || 
|-id=273 bgcolor=#fefefe
| 210273 ||  || — || October 7, 2007 || RAS || A. Lowe || FLO || align=right | 1.0 km || 
|-id=274 bgcolor=#fefefe
| 210274 ||  || — || October 6, 2007 || Socorro || LINEAR || — || align=right | 1.0 km || 
|-id=275 bgcolor=#E9E9E9
| 210275 ||  || — || October 6, 2007 || Socorro || LINEAR || — || align=right | 4.0 km || 
|-id=276 bgcolor=#fefefe
| 210276 ||  || — || October 6, 2007 || Socorro || LINEAR || — || align=right | 1.2 km || 
|-id=277 bgcolor=#fefefe
| 210277 ||  || — || October 7, 2007 || Socorro || LINEAR || V || align=right data-sort-value="0.92" | 920 m || 
|-id=278 bgcolor=#d6d6d6
| 210278 ||  || — || October 4, 2007 || Kitt Peak || Spacewatch || — || align=right | 2.9 km || 
|-id=279 bgcolor=#E9E9E9
| 210279 ||  || — || October 4, 2007 || Kitt Peak || Spacewatch || — || align=right | 2.8 km || 
|-id=280 bgcolor=#E9E9E9
| 210280 ||  || — || October 6, 2007 || Kitt Peak || Spacewatch || AST || align=right | 2.9 km || 
|-id=281 bgcolor=#E9E9E9
| 210281 ||  || — || October 7, 2007 || Mount Lemmon || Mount Lemmon Survey || NEM || align=right | 3.4 km || 
|-id=282 bgcolor=#fefefe
| 210282 ||  || — || October 7, 2007 || Mount Lemmon || Mount Lemmon Survey || NYS || align=right | 1.1 km || 
|-id=283 bgcolor=#d6d6d6
| 210283 ||  || — || October 7, 2007 || Mount Lemmon || Mount Lemmon Survey || THM || align=right | 2.6 km || 
|-id=284 bgcolor=#E9E9E9
| 210284 ||  || — || October 4, 2007 || Kitt Peak || Spacewatch || — || align=right | 2.3 km || 
|-id=285 bgcolor=#E9E9E9
| 210285 ||  || — || October 4, 2007 || Kitt Peak || Spacewatch || — || align=right | 1.7 km || 
|-id=286 bgcolor=#E9E9E9
| 210286 ||  || — || October 4, 2007 || Kitt Peak || Spacewatch || HEN || align=right | 1.5 km || 
|-id=287 bgcolor=#fefefe
| 210287 ||  || — || October 6, 2007 || Kitt Peak || Spacewatch || NYS || align=right data-sort-value="0.83" | 830 m || 
|-id=288 bgcolor=#E9E9E9
| 210288 ||  || — || October 6, 2007 || Kitt Peak || Spacewatch || — || align=right | 1.6 km || 
|-id=289 bgcolor=#E9E9E9
| 210289 ||  || — || October 8, 2007 || Anderson Mesa || LONEOS || — || align=right | 3.2 km || 
|-id=290 bgcolor=#d6d6d6
| 210290 Borsellino ||  ||  || October 13, 2007 || Vallemare di Borbona || V. S. Casulli || — || align=right | 3.9 km || 
|-id=291 bgcolor=#d6d6d6
| 210291 ||  || — || October 14, 2007 || Bergisch Gladbach || W. Bickel || KOR || align=right | 1.8 km || 
|-id=292 bgcolor=#E9E9E9
| 210292 Mayongsheng ||  ||  || October 6, 2007 || XuYi || PMO NEO || GEF || align=right | 2.4 km || 
|-id=293 bgcolor=#E9E9E9
| 210293 ||  || — || October 7, 2007 || Catalina || CSS || — || align=right | 1.4 km || 
|-id=294 bgcolor=#E9E9E9
| 210294 ||  || — || October 5, 2007 || La Cañada || J. Lacruz || — || align=right | 2.5 km || 
|-id=295 bgcolor=#d6d6d6
| 210295 ||  || — || October 7, 2007 || Catalina || CSS || — || align=right | 3.5 km || 
|-id=296 bgcolor=#E9E9E9
| 210296 ||  || — || October 7, 2007 || Catalina || CSS || — || align=right | 2.5 km || 
|-id=297 bgcolor=#fefefe
| 210297 ||  || — || October 8, 2007 || Mount Lemmon || Mount Lemmon Survey || FLO || align=right data-sort-value="0.79" | 790 m || 
|-id=298 bgcolor=#E9E9E9
| 210298 ||  || — || October 13, 2007 || Calvin-Rehoboth || Calvin–Rehoboth Obs. || — || align=right | 1.7 km || 
|-id=299 bgcolor=#fefefe
| 210299 ||  || — || October 7, 2007 || Catalina || CSS || — || align=right | 1.2 km || 
|-id=300 bgcolor=#E9E9E9
| 210300 ||  || — || October 8, 2007 || Anderson Mesa || LONEOS || — || align=right | 3.4 km || 
|}

210301–210400 

|-bgcolor=#E9E9E9
| 210301 ||  || — || October 6, 2007 || Kitt Peak || Spacewatch || — || align=right | 2.3 km || 
|-id=302 bgcolor=#E9E9E9
| 210302 ||  || — || October 6, 2007 || Kitt Peak || Spacewatch || — || align=right | 2.8 km || 
|-id=303 bgcolor=#E9E9E9
| 210303 ||  || — || October 9, 2007 || Mount Lemmon || Mount Lemmon Survey || HEN || align=right | 1.1 km || 
|-id=304 bgcolor=#E9E9E9
| 210304 ||  || — || October 6, 2007 || Socorro || LINEAR || — || align=right | 1.9 km || 
|-id=305 bgcolor=#fefefe
| 210305 ||  || — || October 6, 2007 || Socorro || LINEAR || NYS || align=right | 1.1 km || 
|-id=306 bgcolor=#d6d6d6
| 210306 ||  || — || October 8, 2007 || Socorro || LINEAR || — || align=right | 5.5 km || 
|-id=307 bgcolor=#d6d6d6
| 210307 ||  || — || October 9, 2007 || Socorro || LINEAR || — || align=right | 4.0 km || 
|-id=308 bgcolor=#fefefe
| 210308 ||  || — || October 9, 2007 || Socorro || LINEAR || — || align=right | 1.2 km || 
|-id=309 bgcolor=#E9E9E9
| 210309 ||  || — || October 9, 2007 || Socorro || LINEAR || — || align=right | 3.6 km || 
|-id=310 bgcolor=#fefefe
| 210310 ||  || — || October 9, 2007 || Socorro || LINEAR || NYS || align=right | 2.3 km || 
|-id=311 bgcolor=#E9E9E9
| 210311 ||  || — || October 9, 2007 || Socorro || LINEAR || — || align=right | 3.5 km || 
|-id=312 bgcolor=#E9E9E9
| 210312 ||  || — || October 9, 2007 || Socorro || LINEAR || — || align=right | 2.7 km || 
|-id=313 bgcolor=#fefefe
| 210313 ||  || — || October 11, 2007 || Socorro || LINEAR || NYS || align=right data-sort-value="0.94" | 940 m || 
|-id=314 bgcolor=#E9E9E9
| 210314 ||  || — || October 12, 2007 || Socorro || LINEAR || — || align=right | 1.8 km || 
|-id=315 bgcolor=#fefefe
| 210315 ||  || — || October 4, 2007 || Mount Lemmon || Mount Lemmon Survey || — || align=right | 1.1 km || 
|-id=316 bgcolor=#E9E9E9
| 210316 ||  || — || October 7, 2007 || Kitt Peak || Spacewatch || — || align=right | 2.5 km || 
|-id=317 bgcolor=#d6d6d6
| 210317 ||  || — || October 7, 2007 || Kitt Peak || Spacewatch || — || align=right | 4.1 km || 
|-id=318 bgcolor=#E9E9E9
| 210318 ||  || — || October 7, 2007 || Kitt Peak || Spacewatch || — || align=right | 1.9 km || 
|-id=319 bgcolor=#E9E9E9
| 210319 ||  || — || October 8, 2007 || Kitt Peak || Spacewatch || XIZ || align=right | 1.6 km || 
|-id=320 bgcolor=#d6d6d6
| 210320 ||  || — || October 8, 2007 || Mount Lemmon || Mount Lemmon Survey || — || align=right | 2.7 km || 
|-id=321 bgcolor=#E9E9E9
| 210321 ||  || — || October 8, 2007 || Kitt Peak || Spacewatch || — || align=right | 1.8 km || 
|-id=322 bgcolor=#E9E9E9
| 210322 ||  || — || October 10, 2007 || Mount Lemmon || Mount Lemmon Survey || — || align=right | 2.7 km || 
|-id=323 bgcolor=#d6d6d6
| 210323 ||  || — || October 7, 2007 || Črni Vrh || Črni Vrh || — || align=right | 5.2 km || 
|-id=324 bgcolor=#E9E9E9
| 210324 ||  || — || October 8, 2007 || Catalina || CSS || — || align=right | 3.4 km || 
|-id=325 bgcolor=#E9E9E9
| 210325 ||  || — || October 9, 2007 || Kitt Peak || Spacewatch || — || align=right | 1.2 km || 
|-id=326 bgcolor=#E9E9E9
| 210326 ||  || — || October 10, 2007 || Kitt Peak || Spacewatch || PAD || align=right | 4.2 km || 
|-id=327 bgcolor=#fefefe
| 210327 ||  || — || October 10, 2007 || Kitt Peak || Spacewatch || MAS || align=right data-sort-value="0.82" | 820 m || 
|-id=328 bgcolor=#E9E9E9
| 210328 ||  || — || October 11, 2007 || Mount Lemmon || Mount Lemmon Survey || — || align=right | 2.3 km || 
|-id=329 bgcolor=#E9E9E9
| 210329 ||  || — || October 11, 2007 || Mount Lemmon || Mount Lemmon Survey || — || align=right | 1.5 km || 
|-id=330 bgcolor=#fefefe
| 210330 ||  || — || October 7, 2007 || Mount Lemmon || Mount Lemmon Survey || — || align=right data-sort-value="0.89" | 890 m || 
|-id=331 bgcolor=#E9E9E9
| 210331 ||  || — || October 12, 2007 || Kitt Peak || Spacewatch || — || align=right | 1.9 km || 
|-id=332 bgcolor=#E9E9E9
| 210332 ||  || — || October 12, 2007 || Kitt Peak || Spacewatch || — || align=right | 2.9 km || 
|-id=333 bgcolor=#E9E9E9
| 210333 ||  || — || October 12, 2007 || Kitt Peak || Spacewatch || — || align=right | 1.3 km || 
|-id=334 bgcolor=#E9E9E9
| 210334 ||  || — || October 11, 2007 || Catalina || CSS || — || align=right | 2.6 km || 
|-id=335 bgcolor=#E9E9E9
| 210335 ||  || — || October 10, 2007 || Mount Lemmon || Mount Lemmon Survey || AGN || align=right | 1.6 km || 
|-id=336 bgcolor=#E9E9E9
| 210336 ||  || — || October 14, 2007 || Kitt Peak || Spacewatch || AGN || align=right | 1.6 km || 
|-id=337 bgcolor=#fefefe
| 210337 ||  || — || October 14, 2007 || Kitt Peak || Spacewatch || MAS || align=right data-sort-value="0.93" | 930 m || 
|-id=338 bgcolor=#E9E9E9
| 210338 ||  || — || October 14, 2007 || Kitt Peak || Spacewatch || — || align=right | 2.4 km || 
|-id=339 bgcolor=#E9E9E9
| 210339 ||  || — || October 14, 2007 || Kitt Peak || Spacewatch || BRG || align=right | 2.4 km || 
|-id=340 bgcolor=#d6d6d6
| 210340 ||  || — || October 14, 2007 || Kitt Peak || Spacewatch || 3:2 || align=right | 5.2 km || 
|-id=341 bgcolor=#d6d6d6
| 210341 ||  || — || October 15, 2007 || Catalina || CSS || — || align=right | 4.3 km || 
|-id=342 bgcolor=#fefefe
| 210342 ||  || — || October 13, 2007 || Catalina || CSS || V || align=right data-sort-value="0.99" | 990 m || 
|-id=343 bgcolor=#fefefe
| 210343 ||  || — || October 15, 2007 || Lulin Observatory || LUSS || — || align=right | 1.1 km || 
|-id=344 bgcolor=#fefefe
| 210344 ||  || — || October 11, 2007 || Kitt Peak || Spacewatch || MAS || align=right data-sort-value="0.93" | 930 m || 
|-id=345 bgcolor=#d6d6d6
| 210345 Barbon || 2007 UQ ||  || October 16, 2007 || Vallemare di Borbona || V. S. Casulli || — || align=right | 4.8 km || 
|-id=346 bgcolor=#E9E9E9
| 210346 ||  || — || October 16, 2007 || Bisei SG Center || BATTeRS || — || align=right | 2.7 km || 
|-id=347 bgcolor=#fefefe
| 210347 ||  || — || October 17, 2007 || Junk Bond || D. Healy || V || align=right | 1.1 km || 
|-id=348 bgcolor=#E9E9E9
| 210348 ||  || — || October 17, 2007 || Bisei SG Center || BATTeRS || — || align=right | 2.2 km || 
|-id=349 bgcolor=#E9E9E9
| 210349 ||  || — || October 16, 2007 || Bisei SG Center || BATTeRS || GEF || align=right | 2.0 km || 
|-id=350 bgcolor=#E9E9E9
| 210350 Mariolisa ||  ||  || October 22, 2007 || Skylive Obs. || F. Tozzi || — || align=right | 2.6 km || 
|-id=351 bgcolor=#E9E9E9
| 210351 ||  || — || October 17, 2007 || Anderson Mesa || LONEOS || — || align=right | 1.3 km || 
|-id=352 bgcolor=#d6d6d6
| 210352 ||  || — || October 18, 2007 || Socorro || LINEAR || — || align=right | 4.1 km || 
|-id=353 bgcolor=#E9E9E9
| 210353 ||  || — || October 18, 2007 || Mount Lemmon || Mount Lemmon Survey || — || align=right | 1.3 km || 
|-id=354 bgcolor=#E9E9E9
| 210354 ||  || — || October 18, 2007 || Mount Lemmon || Mount Lemmon Survey || — || align=right | 1.1 km || 
|-id=355 bgcolor=#fefefe
| 210355 ||  || — || October 19, 2007 || Catalina || CSS || FLO || align=right | 1.1 km || 
|-id=356 bgcolor=#E9E9E9
| 210356 ||  || — || October 16, 2007 || Kitt Peak || Spacewatch || — || align=right | 2.0 km || 
|-id=357 bgcolor=#E9E9E9
| 210357 ||  || — || October 21, 2007 || Kitt Peak || Spacewatch || — || align=right | 1.7 km || 
|-id=358 bgcolor=#fefefe
| 210358 ||  || — || October 20, 2007 || Mount Lemmon || Mount Lemmon Survey || — || align=right | 1.2 km || 
|-id=359 bgcolor=#fefefe
| 210359 ||  || — || October 24, 2007 || Mount Lemmon || Mount Lemmon Survey || V || align=right data-sort-value="0.99" | 990 m || 
|-id=360 bgcolor=#E9E9E9
| 210360 ||  || — || October 30, 2007 || Kitt Peak || Spacewatch || — || align=right | 1.9 km || 
|-id=361 bgcolor=#E9E9E9
| 210361 ||  || — || October 30, 2007 || Mount Lemmon || Mount Lemmon Survey || — || align=right | 1.3 km || 
|-id=362 bgcolor=#E9E9E9
| 210362 ||  || — || October 30, 2007 || Mount Lemmon || Mount Lemmon Survey || HEN || align=right | 1.6 km || 
|-id=363 bgcolor=#d6d6d6
| 210363 ||  || — || October 30, 2007 || Kitt Peak || Spacewatch || — || align=right | 3.4 km || 
|-id=364 bgcolor=#E9E9E9
| 210364 ||  || — || October 30, 2007 || Mount Lemmon || Mount Lemmon Survey || MRX || align=right | 1.5 km || 
|-id=365 bgcolor=#E9E9E9
| 210365 ||  || — || October 30, 2007 || Kitt Peak || Spacewatch || AST || align=right | 2.1 km || 
|-id=366 bgcolor=#fefefe
| 210366 ||  || — || October 30, 2007 || Mount Lemmon || Mount Lemmon Survey || — || align=right | 1.3 km || 
|-id=367 bgcolor=#d6d6d6
| 210367 ||  || — || October 31, 2007 || Kitt Peak || Spacewatch || — || align=right | 3.2 km || 
|-id=368 bgcolor=#d6d6d6
| 210368 ||  || — || October 31, 2007 || Kitt Peak || Spacewatch || EOS || align=right | 5.8 km || 
|-id=369 bgcolor=#fefefe
| 210369 ||  || — || October 20, 2007 || Mount Lemmon || Mount Lemmon Survey || MAS || align=right data-sort-value="0.91" | 910 m || 
|-id=370 bgcolor=#E9E9E9
| 210370 ||  || — || November 5, 2007 || Kitt Peak || Spacewatch || — || align=right | 1.6 km || 
|-id=371 bgcolor=#d6d6d6
| 210371 ||  || — || November 2, 2007 || Catalina || CSS || EOS || align=right | 3.0 km || 
|-id=372 bgcolor=#d6d6d6
| 210372 ||  || — || November 3, 2007 || Kitt Peak || Spacewatch || KOR || align=right | 1.8 km || 
|-id=373 bgcolor=#fefefe
| 210373 ||  || — || November 2, 2007 || Catalina || CSS || — || align=right | 1.1 km || 
|-id=374 bgcolor=#E9E9E9
| 210374 ||  || — || November 3, 2007 || Kitt Peak || Spacewatch || — || align=right | 3.1 km || 
|-id=375 bgcolor=#fefefe
| 210375 ||  || — || November 1, 2007 || Kitt Peak || Spacewatch || V || align=right | 1.0 km || 
|-id=376 bgcolor=#fefefe
| 210376 ||  || — || November 1, 2007 || Kitt Peak || Spacewatch || V || align=right | 1.1 km || 
|-id=377 bgcolor=#E9E9E9
| 210377 ||  || — || November 1, 2007 || Kitt Peak || Spacewatch || — || align=right | 3.1 km || 
|-id=378 bgcolor=#E9E9E9
| 210378 ||  || — || November 1, 2007 || Kitt Peak || Spacewatch || HEN || align=right | 1.4 km || 
|-id=379 bgcolor=#d6d6d6
| 210379 ||  || — || November 3, 2007 || Kitt Peak || Spacewatch || — || align=right | 3.7 km || 
|-id=380 bgcolor=#d6d6d6
| 210380 ||  || — || November 1, 2007 || Socorro || LINEAR || TEL || align=right | 2.1 km || 
|-id=381 bgcolor=#E9E9E9
| 210381 ||  || — || November 2, 2007 || Socorro || LINEAR || — || align=right | 2.9 km || 
|-id=382 bgcolor=#d6d6d6
| 210382 ||  || — || November 2, 2007 || Socorro || LINEAR || 7:4 || align=right | 6.6 km || 
|-id=383 bgcolor=#E9E9E9
| 210383 ||  || — || November 9, 2007 || Calvin-Rehoboth || L. A. Molnar || WIT || align=right | 1.4 km || 
|-id=384 bgcolor=#d6d6d6
| 210384 ||  || — || November 2, 2007 || Kitt Peak || Spacewatch || — || align=right | 3.4 km || 
|-id=385 bgcolor=#d6d6d6
| 210385 ||  || — || November 3, 2007 || Kitt Peak || Spacewatch || — || align=right | 2.7 km || 
|-id=386 bgcolor=#E9E9E9
| 210386 ||  || — || November 4, 2007 || Kitt Peak || Spacewatch || — || align=right | 1.8 km || 
|-id=387 bgcolor=#fefefe
| 210387 ||  || — || November 1, 2007 || Mount Lemmon || Mount Lemmon Survey || MAS || align=right data-sort-value="0.91" | 910 m || 
|-id=388 bgcolor=#d6d6d6
| 210388 ||  || — || November 1, 2007 || Mount Lemmon || Mount Lemmon Survey || — || align=right | 2.8 km || 
|-id=389 bgcolor=#FA8072
| 210389 ||  || — || November 7, 2007 || Kitt Peak || Spacewatch || — || align=right data-sort-value="0.86" | 860 m || 
|-id=390 bgcolor=#d6d6d6
| 210390 ||  || — || November 7, 2007 || Kitt Peak || Spacewatch || — || align=right | 4.1 km || 
|-id=391 bgcolor=#fefefe
| 210391 ||  || — || November 5, 2007 || Kitt Peak || Spacewatch || NYS || align=right data-sort-value="0.99" | 990 m || 
|-id=392 bgcolor=#E9E9E9
| 210392 ||  || — || November 5, 2007 || Kitt Peak || Spacewatch || — || align=right | 2.0 km || 
|-id=393 bgcolor=#d6d6d6
| 210393 ||  || — || November 7, 2007 || Mount Lemmon || Mount Lemmon Survey || — || align=right | 3.2 km || 
|-id=394 bgcolor=#E9E9E9
| 210394 ||  || — || November 7, 2007 || Catalina || CSS || HOF || align=right | 4.3 km || 
|-id=395 bgcolor=#fefefe
| 210395 ||  || — || November 9, 2007 || Kitt Peak || Spacewatch || — || align=right | 1.3 km || 
|-id=396 bgcolor=#fefefe
| 210396 ||  || — || November 7, 2007 || Mount Lemmon || Mount Lemmon Survey || — || align=right data-sort-value="0.86" | 860 m || 
|-id=397 bgcolor=#E9E9E9
| 210397 ||  || — || November 8, 2007 || Kitt Peak || Spacewatch || — || align=right | 4.1 km || 
|-id=398 bgcolor=#E9E9E9
| 210398 ||  || — || November 13, 2007 || Kitt Peak || Spacewatch || — || align=right | 2.6 km || 
|-id=399 bgcolor=#d6d6d6
| 210399 ||  || — || November 9, 2007 || Catalina || CSS || — || align=right | 6.5 km || 
|-id=400 bgcolor=#d6d6d6
| 210400 ||  || — || November 14, 2007 || Bisei SG Center || BATTeRS || — || align=right | 3.5 km || 
|}

210401–210500 

|-bgcolor=#fefefe
| 210401 ||  || — || November 14, 2007 || Mount Lemmon || Mount Lemmon Survey || — || align=right data-sort-value="0.97" | 970 m || 
|-id=402 bgcolor=#d6d6d6
| 210402 ||  || — || November 15, 2007 || Catalina || CSS || — || align=right | 4.7 km || 
|-id=403 bgcolor=#d6d6d6
| 210403 ||  || — || November 13, 2007 || Kitt Peak || Spacewatch || KOR || align=right | 2.3 km || 
|-id=404 bgcolor=#d6d6d6
| 210404 ||  || — || November 12, 2007 || Catalina || CSS || — || align=right | 6.3 km || 
|-id=405 bgcolor=#d6d6d6
| 210405 ||  || — || November 13, 2007 || Catalina || CSS || — || align=right | 5.6 km || 
|-id=406 bgcolor=#fefefe
| 210406 ||  || — || November 5, 2007 || Kitt Peak || Spacewatch || MAS || align=right | 1.1 km || 
|-id=407 bgcolor=#E9E9E9
| 210407 ||  || — || November 8, 2007 || Catalina || CSS || — || align=right | 2.5 km || 
|-id=408 bgcolor=#d6d6d6
| 210408 ||  || — || November 17, 2007 || Socorro || LINEAR || — || align=right | 4.6 km || 
|-id=409 bgcolor=#fefefe
| 210409 ||  || — || November 18, 2007 || Socorro || LINEAR || — || align=right | 1.3 km || 
|-id=410 bgcolor=#d6d6d6
| 210410 ||  || — || November 18, 2007 || Mount Lemmon || Mount Lemmon Survey || ALA || align=right | 5.3 km || 
|-id=411 bgcolor=#d6d6d6
| 210411 ||  || — || November 17, 2007 || Kitt Peak || Spacewatch || — || align=right | 2.3 km || 
|-id=412 bgcolor=#E9E9E9
| 210412 ||  || — || November 21, 2007 || Mount Lemmon || Mount Lemmon Survey || — || align=right | 1.5 km || 
|-id=413 bgcolor=#E9E9E9
| 210413 ||  || — || December 3, 2007 || Catalina || CSS || HOF || align=right | 3.9 km || 
|-id=414 bgcolor=#fefefe
| 210414 Gebartolomei ||  ||  || December 3, 2007 || San Marcello || L. Tesi, G. Fagioli || — || align=right | 1.1 km || 
|-id=415 bgcolor=#E9E9E9
| 210415 ||  || — || December 4, 2007 || Catalina || CSS || — || align=right | 2.4 km || 
|-id=416 bgcolor=#d6d6d6
| 210416 ||  || — || December 4, 2007 || Mount Lemmon || Mount Lemmon Survey || THM || align=right | 2.9 km || 
|-id=417 bgcolor=#d6d6d6
| 210417 ||  || — || December 4, 2007 || Mount Lemmon || Mount Lemmon Survey || THM || align=right | 2.4 km || 
|-id=418 bgcolor=#fefefe
| 210418 ||  || — || December 4, 2007 || Kitt Peak || Spacewatch || FLO || align=right | 1.5 km || 
|-id=419 bgcolor=#E9E9E9
| 210419 ||  || — || December 15, 2007 || Socorro || LINEAR || — || align=right | 3.0 km || 
|-id=420 bgcolor=#d6d6d6
| 210420 ||  || — || December 15, 2007 || Kitt Peak || Spacewatch || — || align=right | 3.3 km || 
|-id=421 bgcolor=#E9E9E9
| 210421 Freundtamás ||  ||  || December 19, 2007 || Piszkéstető || K. Sárneczky || HEN || align=right | 1.3 km || 
|-id=422 bgcolor=#E9E9E9
| 210422 ||  || — || December 16, 2007 || Kitt Peak || Spacewatch || — || align=right | 1.5 km || 
|-id=423 bgcolor=#d6d6d6
| 210423 ||  || — || December 30, 2007 || Kitt Peak || Spacewatch || — || align=right | 4.4 km || 
|-id=424 bgcolor=#d6d6d6
| 210424 ||  || — || January 10, 2008 || Kitt Peak || Spacewatch || — || align=right | 4.2 km || 
|-id=425 bgcolor=#d6d6d6
| 210425 Imogene ||  ||  || January 10, 2008 || Calvin-Rehoboth || Calvin–Rehoboth Obs. || — || align=right | 3.8 km || 
|-id=426 bgcolor=#d6d6d6
| 210426 ||  || — || January 7, 2008 || Great Shefford || P. Birtwhistle || KAR || align=right | 1.6 km || 
|-id=427 bgcolor=#E9E9E9
| 210427 ||  || — || March 1, 2008 || Mount Lemmon || Mount Lemmon Survey || — || align=right | 3.9 km || 
|-id=428 bgcolor=#E9E9E9
| 210428 ||  || — || September 28, 2008 || Socorro || LINEAR || — || align=right | 3.6 km || 
|-id=429 bgcolor=#E9E9E9
| 210429 ||  || — || October 25, 2008 || Kitt Peak || Spacewatch || — || align=right | 3.5 km || 
|-id=430 bgcolor=#E9E9E9
| 210430 ||  || — || November 20, 2008 || Kitt Peak || Spacewatch || AGN || align=right | 1.6 km || 
|-id=431 bgcolor=#d6d6d6
| 210431 ||  || — || November 20, 2008 || Kitt Peak || Spacewatch || VER || align=right | 4.6 km || 
|-id=432 bgcolor=#d6d6d6
| 210432 Dietmarhopp ||  ||  || December 8, 2008 || Calar Alto || F. Hormuth || URS || align=right | 3.5 km || 
|-id=433 bgcolor=#d6d6d6
| 210433 Ullithiele ||  ||  || December 21, 2008 || Calar Alto || F. Hormuth || KOR || align=right | 1.5 km || 
|-id=434 bgcolor=#d6d6d6
| 210434 Fungyuancheng ||  ||  || December 20, 2008 || Lulin Observatory || H.-C. Lin, Q.-z. Ye || — || align=right | 4.8 km || 
|-id=435 bgcolor=#d6d6d6
| 210435 ||  || — || December 28, 2008 || Piszkéstető || K. Sárneczky || — || align=right | 6.0 km || 
|-id=436 bgcolor=#E9E9E9
| 210436 ||  || — || December 29, 2008 || Vicques || M. Ory || — || align=right | 1.4 km || 
|-id=437 bgcolor=#E9E9E9
| 210437 ||  || — || December 29, 2008 || Catalina || CSS || — || align=right | 3.1 km || 
|-id=438 bgcolor=#d6d6d6
| 210438 ||  || — || December 30, 2008 || Mount Lemmon || Mount Lemmon Survey || — || align=right | 3.4 km || 
|-id=439 bgcolor=#E9E9E9
| 210439 ||  || — || December 30, 2008 || Mount Lemmon || Mount Lemmon Survey || — || align=right | 2.3 km || 
|-id=440 bgcolor=#fefefe
| 210440 ||  || — || December 29, 2008 || Kitt Peak || Spacewatch || NYS || align=right data-sort-value="0.87" | 870 m || 
|-id=441 bgcolor=#fefefe
| 210441 ||  || — || December 30, 2008 || Kitt Peak || Spacewatch || — || align=right data-sort-value="0.73" | 730 m || 
|-id=442 bgcolor=#E9E9E9
| 210442 ||  || — || December 30, 2008 || OAM || OAM Obs. || GEF || align=right | 1.7 km || 
|-id=443 bgcolor=#fefefe
| 210443 || 2009 BN || — || January 16, 2009 || Dauban || Chante-Perdrix Obs. || — || align=right | 1.2 km || 
|-id=444 bgcolor=#fefefe
| 210444 Frithjof || 2009 BX ||  || January 16, 2009 || Calar Alto || F. Hormuth || — || align=right data-sort-value="0.91" | 910 m || 
|-id=445 bgcolor=#E9E9E9
| 210445 ||  || — || January 17, 2009 || RAS || A. Lowe || VIB || align=right | 3.1 km || 
|-id=446 bgcolor=#fefefe
| 210446 ||  || — || January 20, 2009 || Catalina || CSS || — || align=right data-sort-value="0.93" | 930 m || 
|-id=447 bgcolor=#fefefe
| 210447 ||  || — || January 25, 2009 || Catalina || CSS || — || align=right | 1.5 km || 
|-id=448 bgcolor=#fefefe
| 210448 ||  || — || January 30, 2009 || Kachina || Kachina Obs. || — || align=right | 1.1 km || 
|-id=449 bgcolor=#E9E9E9
| 210449 || 2136 P-L || — || September 24, 1960 || Palomar || PLS || IAN || align=right | 1.0 km || 
|-id=450 bgcolor=#d6d6d6
| 210450 || 2619 P-L || — || September 24, 1960 || Palomar || PLS || — || align=right | 6.6 km || 
|-id=451 bgcolor=#fefefe
| 210451 || 2806 P-L || — || September 24, 1960 || Palomar || PLS || — || align=right | 1.3 km || 
|-id=452 bgcolor=#fefefe
| 210452 || 2032 T-2 || — || September 29, 1973 || Palomar || PLS || NYS || align=right data-sort-value="0.79" | 790 m || 
|-id=453 bgcolor=#fefefe
| 210453 || 2673 T-3 || — || October 11, 1977 || Palomar || PLS || — || align=right | 1.3 km || 
|-id=454 bgcolor=#fefefe
| 210454 || 4307 T-3 || — || October 16, 1977 || Palomar || PLS || — || align=right | 1.2 km || 
|-id=455 bgcolor=#d6d6d6
| 210455 ||  || — || March 7, 1981 || Siding Spring || S. J. Bus || — || align=right | 2.8 km || 
|-id=456 bgcolor=#fefefe
| 210456 ||  || — || October 6, 1991 || Kitt Peak || Spacewatch || — || align=right | 3.1 km || 
|-id=457 bgcolor=#d6d6d6
| 210457 ||  || — || March 17, 1993 || La Silla || UESAC || THM || align=right | 3.1 km || 
|-id=458 bgcolor=#d6d6d6
| 210458 ||  || — || March 19, 1993 || La Silla || UESAC || — || align=right | 4.5 km || 
|-id=459 bgcolor=#fefefe
| 210459 ||  || — || October 9, 1993 || La Silla || E. W. Elst || NYS || align=right data-sort-value="0.95" | 950 m || 
|-id=460 bgcolor=#fefefe
| 210460 ||  || — || January 8, 1994 || Kitt Peak || Spacewatch || — || align=right | 1.2 km || 
|-id=461 bgcolor=#d6d6d6
| 210461 ||  || — || February 15, 1994 || Kitt Peak || Spacewatch || — || align=right | 3.1 km || 
|-id=462 bgcolor=#d6d6d6
| 210462 ||  || — || September 28, 1994 || Kitt Peak || Spacewatch || — || align=right | 3.4 km || 
|-id=463 bgcolor=#d6d6d6
| 210463 ||  || — || September 28, 1994 || Kitt Peak || Spacewatch || — || align=right | 4.1 km || 
|-id=464 bgcolor=#E9E9E9
| 210464 ||  || — || November 5, 1994 || Kitt Peak || Spacewatch || — || align=right | 3.6 km || 
|-id=465 bgcolor=#E9E9E9
| 210465 ||  || — || December 1, 1994 || Kitt Peak || Spacewatch || — || align=right | 2.0 km || 
|-id=466 bgcolor=#E9E9E9
| 210466 ||  || — || March 23, 1995 || Kitt Peak || Spacewatch || — || align=right | 2.8 km || 
|-id=467 bgcolor=#fefefe
| 210467 ||  || — || April 26, 1995 || Kitt Peak || Spacewatch || NYS || align=right data-sort-value="0.84" | 840 m || 
|-id=468 bgcolor=#fefefe
| 210468 ||  || — || September 17, 1995 || Kitt Peak || Spacewatch || — || align=right | 1.3 km || 
|-id=469 bgcolor=#d6d6d6
| 210469 ||  || — || September 17, 1995 || Kitt Peak || Spacewatch || — || align=right | 3.6 km || 
|-id=470 bgcolor=#E9E9E9
| 210470 ||  || — || September 18, 1995 || Kitt Peak || Spacewatch || — || align=right | 1.1 km || 
|-id=471 bgcolor=#fefefe
| 210471 ||  || — || September 18, 1995 || Kitt Peak || Spacewatch || MAS || align=right data-sort-value="0.93" | 930 m || 
|-id=472 bgcolor=#d6d6d6
| 210472 ||  || — || September 19, 1995 || Kitt Peak || Spacewatch || — || align=right | 3.4 km || 
|-id=473 bgcolor=#fefefe
| 210473 ||  || — || September 29, 1995 || Kitt Peak || Spacewatch || MAS || align=right data-sort-value="0.71" | 710 m || 
|-id=474 bgcolor=#d6d6d6
| 210474 ||  || — || September 24, 1995 || Kitt Peak || Spacewatch || — || align=right | 3.5 km || 
|-id=475 bgcolor=#d6d6d6
| 210475 ||  || — || September 26, 1995 || Kitt Peak || Spacewatch || THM || align=right | 2.4 km || 
|-id=476 bgcolor=#d6d6d6
| 210476 ||  || — || October 22, 1995 || Kleť || Kleť Obs. || — || align=right | 3.9 km || 
|-id=477 bgcolor=#fefefe
| 210477 ||  || — || October 18, 1995 || Kitt Peak || Spacewatch || NYS || align=right data-sort-value="0.87" | 870 m || 
|-id=478 bgcolor=#d6d6d6
| 210478 ||  || — || October 17, 1995 || Kitt Peak || Spacewatch || HYG || align=right | 3.4 km || 
|-id=479 bgcolor=#E9E9E9
| 210479 ||  || — || December 14, 1995 || Kitt Peak || Spacewatch || — || align=right | 2.0 km || 
|-id=480 bgcolor=#E9E9E9
| 210480 ||  || — || March 11, 1996 || Kitt Peak || Spacewatch || — || align=right | 1.9 km || 
|-id=481 bgcolor=#fefefe
| 210481 ||  || — || April 20, 1996 || Haleakala || AMOS || H || align=right data-sort-value="0.99" | 990 m || 
|-id=482 bgcolor=#FA8072
| 210482 ||  || — || September 11, 1996 || Haleakala || NEAT || — || align=right | 1.3 km || 
|-id=483 bgcolor=#fefefe
| 210483 ||  || — || September 5, 1996 || Kitt Peak || Spacewatch || — || align=right data-sort-value="0.89" | 890 m || 
|-id=484 bgcolor=#d6d6d6
| 210484 ||  || — || September 15, 1996 || Kitt Peak || Spacewatch || KOR || align=right | 1.6 km || 
|-id=485 bgcolor=#fefefe
| 210485 || 1996 TK || — || October 3, 1996 || Prescott || P. G. Comba || MAS || align=right data-sort-value="0.99" | 990 m || 
|-id=486 bgcolor=#fefefe
| 210486 ||  || — || October 4, 1996 || Kitt Peak || Spacewatch || NYS || align=right data-sort-value="0.97" | 970 m || 
|-id=487 bgcolor=#d6d6d6
| 210487 ||  || — || November 3, 1996 || Kitt Peak || Spacewatch || — || align=right | 4.4 km || 
|-id=488 bgcolor=#fefefe
| 210488 ||  || — || December 2, 1996 || Kitt Peak || Spacewatch || — || align=right | 1.4 km || 
|-id=489 bgcolor=#d6d6d6
| 210489 ||  || — || January 15, 1997 || Chichibu || N. Satō || — || align=right | 5.2 km || 
|-id=490 bgcolor=#fefefe
| 210490 ||  || — || February 3, 1997 || Kitt Peak || Spacewatch || MAS || align=right data-sort-value="0.90" | 900 m || 
|-id=491 bgcolor=#E9E9E9
| 210491 ||  || — || April 7, 1997 || Kitt Peak || Spacewatch || — || align=right | 1.1 km || 
|-id=492 bgcolor=#E9E9E9
| 210492 ||  || — || September 28, 1997 || Kitt Peak || Spacewatch || — || align=right | 2.9 km || 
|-id=493 bgcolor=#E9E9E9
| 210493 ||  || — || September 29, 1997 || Kitt Peak || Spacewatch || — || align=right | 2.6 km || 
|-id=494 bgcolor=#E9E9E9
| 210494 ||  || — || September 28, 1997 || Lake Clear || K. A. Williams || HNA || align=right | 4.1 km || 
|-id=495 bgcolor=#fefefe
| 210495 ||  || — || March 20, 1998 || Socorro || LINEAR || ERI || align=right | 2.9 km || 
|-id=496 bgcolor=#fefefe
| 210496 ||  || — || March 20, 1998 || Socorro || LINEAR || — || align=right | 1.4 km || 
|-id=497 bgcolor=#fefefe
| 210497 ||  || — || April 22, 1998 || Kitt Peak || Spacewatch || NYS || align=right data-sort-value="0.90" | 900 m || 
|-id=498 bgcolor=#fefefe
| 210498 ||  || — || April 17, 1998 || Kitt Peak || Spacewatch || V || align=right | 1.0 km || 
|-id=499 bgcolor=#fefefe
| 210499 ||  || — || April 20, 1998 || Socorro || LINEAR || NYS || align=right | 1.3 km || 
|-id=500 bgcolor=#fefefe
| 210500 ||  || — || April 18, 1998 || Kitt Peak || Spacewatch || NYS || align=right data-sort-value="0.89" | 890 m || 
|}

210501–210600 

|-bgcolor=#fefefe
| 210501 ||  || — || April 28, 1998 || Kitt Peak || Spacewatch || NYS || align=right data-sort-value="0.92" | 920 m || 
|-id=502 bgcolor=#fefefe
| 210502 ||  || — || April 21, 1998 || Socorro || LINEAR || — || align=right | 1.2 km || 
|-id=503 bgcolor=#fefefe
| 210503 ||  || — || April 21, 1998 || Socorro || LINEAR || NYS || align=right | 1.2 km || 
|-id=504 bgcolor=#d6d6d6
| 210504 ||  || — || April 21, 1998 || Socorro || LINEAR || — || align=right | 5.6 km || 
|-id=505 bgcolor=#fefefe
| 210505 ||  || — || April 23, 1998 || Socorro || LINEAR || — || align=right | 1.2 km || 
|-id=506 bgcolor=#d6d6d6
| 210506 ||  || — || May 18, 1998 || Kitt Peak || Spacewatch || HYG || align=right | 3.9 km || 
|-id=507 bgcolor=#d6d6d6
| 210507 ||  || — || May 22, 1998 || Kitt Peak || Spacewatch || — || align=right | 4.2 km || 
|-id=508 bgcolor=#E9E9E9
| 210508 ||  || — || June 26, 1998 || Kitt Peak || Spacewatch || — || align=right | 1.5 km || 
|-id=509 bgcolor=#d6d6d6
| 210509 ||  || — || June 27, 1998 || Kitt Peak || Spacewatch || — || align=right | 3.0 km || 
|-id=510 bgcolor=#fefefe
| 210510 || 1998 NR || — || July 11, 1998 || Woomera || F. B. Zoltowski || — || align=right | 1.4 km || 
|-id=511 bgcolor=#E9E9E9
| 210511 ||  || — || July 22, 1998 || Reedy Creek || J. Broughton || MIT || align=right | 4.9 km || 
|-id=512 bgcolor=#E9E9E9
| 210512 ||  || — || August 23, 1998 || Kitt Peak || Spacewatch || JUN || align=right | 1.5 km || 
|-id=513 bgcolor=#E9E9E9
| 210513 ||  || — || August 24, 1998 || Socorro || LINEAR || EUN || align=right | 2.4 km || 
|-id=514 bgcolor=#E9E9E9
| 210514 ||  || — || August 24, 1998 || Socorro || LINEAR || MAR || align=right | 2.4 km || 
|-id=515 bgcolor=#E9E9E9
| 210515 ||  || — || September 15, 1998 || Kitt Peak || Spacewatch || — || align=right | 1.2 km || 
|-id=516 bgcolor=#E9E9E9
| 210516 ||  || — || September 14, 1998 || Socorro || LINEAR || — || align=right | 1.3 km || 
|-id=517 bgcolor=#E9E9E9
| 210517 ||  || — || September 14, 1998 || Socorro || LINEAR || — || align=right | 2.6 km || 
|-id=518 bgcolor=#E9E9E9
| 210518 ||  || — || September 26, 1998 || Xinglong || SCAP || — || align=right | 4.1 km || 
|-id=519 bgcolor=#E9E9E9
| 210519 ||  || — || September 25, 1998 || Kitt Peak || Spacewatch || — || align=right | 1.2 km || 
|-id=520 bgcolor=#E9E9E9
| 210520 ||  || — || September 26, 1998 || Socorro || LINEAR || ADE || align=right | 3.0 km || 
|-id=521 bgcolor=#E9E9E9
| 210521 ||  || — || September 26, 1998 || Socorro || LINEAR || EUN || align=right | 2.2 km || 
|-id=522 bgcolor=#E9E9E9
| 210522 ||  || — || September 26, 1998 || Socorro || LINEAR || RAF || align=right | 1.6 km || 
|-id=523 bgcolor=#E9E9E9
| 210523 ||  || — || September 25, 1998 || Anderson Mesa || LONEOS || — || align=right | 2.2 km || 
|-id=524 bgcolor=#E9E9E9
| 210524 ||  || — || October 14, 1998 || Kitt Peak || Spacewatch || — || align=right | 1.8 km || 
|-id=525 bgcolor=#E9E9E9
| 210525 ||  || — || October 18, 1998 || La Silla || E. W. Elst || — || align=right | 4.6 km || 
|-id=526 bgcolor=#E9E9E9
| 210526 ||  || — || November 14, 1998 || Kitt Peak || Spacewatch || NEM || align=right | 3.5 km || 
|-id=527 bgcolor=#E9E9E9
| 210527 ||  || — || November 14, 1998 || Kitt Peak || Spacewatch || — || align=right | 1.6 km || 
|-id=528 bgcolor=#E9E9E9
| 210528 ||  || — || January 8, 1999 || Kitt Peak || Spacewatch || MRX || align=right | 1.2 km || 
|-id=529 bgcolor=#E9E9E9
| 210529 ||  || — || January 8, 1999 || Kitt Peak || Spacewatch || — || align=right | 3.7 km || 
|-id=530 bgcolor=#fefefe
| 210530 ||  || — || February 7, 1999 || Kitt Peak || Spacewatch || — || align=right data-sort-value="0.81" | 810 m || 
|-id=531 bgcolor=#fefefe
| 210531 ||  || — || March 17, 1999 || Caussols || ODAS || — || align=right | 1.4 km || 
|-id=532 bgcolor=#d6d6d6
| 210532 Grantmckee ||  ||  || March 20, 1999 || Apache Point || SDSS || — || align=right | 3.1 km || 
|-id=533 bgcolor=#fefefe
| 210533 Seanmisner ||  ||  || March 20, 1999 || Apache Point || SDSS || — || align=right data-sort-value="0.75" | 750 m || 
|-id=534 bgcolor=#d6d6d6
| 210534 ||  || — || April 7, 1999 || Kitt Peak || Spacewatch || 628 || align=right | 2.7 km || 
|-id=535 bgcolor=#fefefe
| 210535 ||  || — || April 14, 1999 || Kitt Peak || Spacewatch || V || align=right data-sort-value="0.78" | 780 m || 
|-id=536 bgcolor=#fefefe
| 210536 ||  || — || April 19, 1999 || Kitt Peak || Spacewatch || — || align=right | 1.2 km || 
|-id=537 bgcolor=#fefefe
| 210537 ||  || — || May 13, 1999 || Socorro || LINEAR || FLO || align=right data-sort-value="0.92" | 920 m || 
|-id=538 bgcolor=#fefefe
| 210538 ||  || — || June 9, 1999 || Kitt Peak || Spacewatch || — || align=right data-sort-value="0.98" | 980 m || 
|-id=539 bgcolor=#fefefe
| 210539 || 1999 RD || — || September 2, 1999 || Modra || Modra Obs. || PHO || align=right | 1.8 km || 
|-id=540 bgcolor=#fefefe
| 210540 || 1999 RW || — || September 4, 1999 || Catalina || CSS || — || align=right | 1.4 km || 
|-id=541 bgcolor=#fefefe
| 210541 ||  || — || September 4, 1999 || Kitt Peak || Spacewatch || — || align=right data-sort-value="0.90" | 900 m || 
|-id=542 bgcolor=#fefefe
| 210542 ||  || — || September 7, 1999 || Socorro || LINEAR || — || align=right | 1.3 km || 
|-id=543 bgcolor=#d6d6d6
| 210543 ||  || — || September 7, 1999 || Socorro || LINEAR || — || align=right | 4.3 km || 
|-id=544 bgcolor=#fefefe
| 210544 ||  || — || September 7, 1999 || Socorro || LINEAR || — || align=right | 1.4 km || 
|-id=545 bgcolor=#fefefe
| 210545 ||  || — || September 9, 1999 || Socorro || LINEAR || V || align=right | 1.0 km || 
|-id=546 bgcolor=#fefefe
| 210546 ||  || — || September 9, 1999 || Socorro || LINEAR || — || align=right | 1.3 km || 
|-id=547 bgcolor=#fefefe
| 210547 ||  || — || September 9, 1999 || Socorro || LINEAR || — || align=right | 1.5 km || 
|-id=548 bgcolor=#fefefe
| 210548 ||  || — || September 7, 1999 || Anderson Mesa || LONEOS || — || align=right | 1.7 km || 
|-id=549 bgcolor=#fefefe
| 210549 ||  || — || October 4, 1999 || Prescott || P. G. Comba || — || align=right | 1.8 km || 
|-id=550 bgcolor=#E9E9E9
| 210550 ||  || — || October 4, 1999 || Prescott || P. G. Comba || — || align=right | 1.0 km || 
|-id=551 bgcolor=#fefefe
| 210551 ||  || — || October 3, 1999 || Socorro || LINEAR || H || align=right | 1.2 km || 
|-id=552 bgcolor=#fefefe
| 210552 ||  || — || October 3, 1999 || Socorro || LINEAR || NYS || align=right | 2.6 km || 
|-id=553 bgcolor=#fefefe
| 210553 ||  || — || October 4, 1999 || Socorro || LINEAR || — || align=right | 1.4 km || 
|-id=554 bgcolor=#fefefe
| 210554 ||  || — || October 5, 1999 || Catalina || CSS || MAS || align=right | 1.5 km || 
|-id=555 bgcolor=#fefefe
| 210555 ||  || — || October 3, 1999 || Kitt Peak || Spacewatch || NYS || align=right data-sort-value="0.85" | 850 m || 
|-id=556 bgcolor=#fefefe
| 210556 ||  || — || October 4, 1999 || Kitt Peak || Spacewatch || NYS || align=right data-sort-value="0.84" | 840 m || 
|-id=557 bgcolor=#fefefe
| 210557 ||  || — || October 8, 1999 || Kitt Peak || Spacewatch || MAS || align=right data-sort-value="0.98" | 980 m || 
|-id=558 bgcolor=#fefefe
| 210558 ||  || — || October 15, 1999 || Kitt Peak || Spacewatch || NYS || align=right | 4.1 km || 
|-id=559 bgcolor=#d6d6d6
| 210559 ||  || — || October 6, 1999 || Socorro || LINEAR || 7:4 || align=right | 6.9 km || 
|-id=560 bgcolor=#fefefe
| 210560 ||  || — || October 7, 1999 || Socorro || LINEAR || FLO || align=right data-sort-value="0.97" | 970 m || 
|-id=561 bgcolor=#fefefe
| 210561 ||  || — || October 10, 1999 || Socorro || LINEAR || V || align=right | 1.0 km || 
|-id=562 bgcolor=#fefefe
| 210562 ||  || — || October 10, 1999 || Socorro || LINEAR || V || align=right | 1.1 km || 
|-id=563 bgcolor=#fefefe
| 210563 ||  || — || October 10, 1999 || Socorro || LINEAR || — || align=right | 1.4 km || 
|-id=564 bgcolor=#fefefe
| 210564 ||  || — || October 12, 1999 || Socorro || LINEAR || — || align=right | 3.2 km || 
|-id=565 bgcolor=#fefefe
| 210565 ||  || — || October 13, 1999 || Socorro || LINEAR || V || align=right data-sort-value="0.87" | 870 m || 
|-id=566 bgcolor=#fefefe
| 210566 ||  || — || October 14, 1999 || Socorro || LINEAR || H || align=right | 1.1 km || 
|-id=567 bgcolor=#fefefe
| 210567 ||  || — || October 15, 1999 || Socorro || LINEAR || — || align=right | 1.3 km || 
|-id=568 bgcolor=#fefefe
| 210568 ||  || — || October 15, 1999 || Socorro || LINEAR || NYS || align=right data-sort-value="0.94" | 940 m || 
|-id=569 bgcolor=#d6d6d6
| 210569 ||  || — || October 3, 1999 || Socorro || LINEAR || — || align=right | 7.4 km || 
|-id=570 bgcolor=#E9E9E9
| 210570 ||  || — || October 9, 1999 || Kitt Peak || Spacewatch || — || align=right | 1.3 km || 
|-id=571 bgcolor=#fefefe
| 210571 ||  || — || October 9, 1999 || Socorro || LINEAR || H || align=right data-sort-value="0.96" | 960 m || 
|-id=572 bgcolor=#E9E9E9
| 210572 ||  || — || October 8, 1999 || Catalina || CSS || — || align=right | 5.8 km || 
|-id=573 bgcolor=#fefefe
| 210573 ||  || — || October 31, 1999 || Kitt Peak || Spacewatch || — || align=right data-sort-value="0.92" | 920 m || 
|-id=574 bgcolor=#E9E9E9
| 210574 ||  || — || October 31, 1999 || Kitt Peak || Spacewatch || — || align=right | 1.2 km || 
|-id=575 bgcolor=#d6d6d6
| 210575 ||  || — || October 31, 1999 || Kitt Peak || Spacewatch || — || align=right | 2.8 km || 
|-id=576 bgcolor=#E9E9E9
| 210576 ||  || — || November 7, 1999 || Višnjan Observatory || K. Korlević || — || align=right | 1.9 km || 
|-id=577 bgcolor=#E9E9E9
| 210577 ||  || — || November 3, 1999 || Socorro || LINEAR || — || align=right | 1.7 km || 
|-id=578 bgcolor=#fefefe
| 210578 ||  || — || November 4, 1999 || Socorro || LINEAR || — || align=right | 1.8 km || 
|-id=579 bgcolor=#E9E9E9
| 210579 ||  || — || November 4, 1999 || Socorro || LINEAR || — || align=right | 1.8 km || 
|-id=580 bgcolor=#d6d6d6
| 210580 ||  || — || November 5, 1999 || Kitt Peak || Spacewatch || — || align=right | 4.5 km || 
|-id=581 bgcolor=#fefefe
| 210581 ||  || — || November 9, 1999 || Socorro || LINEAR || — || align=right | 1.4 km || 
|-id=582 bgcolor=#fefefe
| 210582 ||  || — || November 14, 1999 || Socorro || LINEAR || — || align=right | 1.7 km || 
|-id=583 bgcolor=#E9E9E9
| 210583 ||  || — || November 9, 1999 || Socorro || LINEAR || — || align=right | 1.1 km || 
|-id=584 bgcolor=#E9E9E9
| 210584 ||  || — || November 15, 1999 || Socorro || LINEAR || — || align=right | 1.1 km || 
|-id=585 bgcolor=#fefefe
| 210585 ||  || — || November 9, 1999 || Socorro || LINEAR || MAS || align=right | 1.5 km || 
|-id=586 bgcolor=#E9E9E9
| 210586 ||  || — || November 5, 1999 || Kitt Peak || Spacewatch || — || align=right | 1.3 km || 
|-id=587 bgcolor=#E9E9E9
| 210587 ||  || — || December 5, 1999 || Socorro || LINEAR || — || align=right | 2.6 km || 
|-id=588 bgcolor=#E9E9E9
| 210588 ||  || — || December 6, 1999 || Socorro || LINEAR || — || align=right | 1.4 km || 
|-id=589 bgcolor=#E9E9E9
| 210589 ||  || — || December 7, 1999 || Socorro || LINEAR || — || align=right | 1.4 km || 
|-id=590 bgcolor=#E9E9E9
| 210590 ||  || — || December 7, 1999 || Socorro || LINEAR || — || align=right | 1.5 km || 
|-id=591 bgcolor=#E9E9E9
| 210591 ||  || — || December 7, 1999 || Socorro || LINEAR || — || align=right | 1.5 km || 
|-id=592 bgcolor=#E9E9E9
| 210592 ||  || — || December 7, 1999 || Socorro || LINEAR || — || align=right | 3.0 km || 
|-id=593 bgcolor=#E9E9E9
| 210593 ||  || — || December 4, 1999 || Catalina || CSS || — || align=right | 1.6 km || 
|-id=594 bgcolor=#fefefe
| 210594 ||  || — || December 7, 1999 || Catalina || CSS || CHL || align=right | 3.7 km || 
|-id=595 bgcolor=#fefefe
| 210595 ||  || — || December 7, 1999 || Kitt Peak || Spacewatch || NYS || align=right | 3.0 km || 
|-id=596 bgcolor=#E9E9E9
| 210596 ||  || — || December 7, 1999 || Kitt Peak || Spacewatch || — || align=right | 1.2 km || 
|-id=597 bgcolor=#E9E9E9
| 210597 ||  || — || December 8, 1999 || Catalina || CSS || JUN || align=right | 1.6 km || 
|-id=598 bgcolor=#E9E9E9
| 210598 ||  || — || December 12, 1999 || Catalina || CSS || — || align=right | 5.4 km || 
|-id=599 bgcolor=#E9E9E9
| 210599 ||  || — || December 30, 1999 || Socorro || LINEAR || — || align=right | 2.4 km || 
|-id=600 bgcolor=#E9E9E9
| 210600 ||  || — || January 2, 2000 || Socorro || LINEAR || — || align=right | 2.5 km || 
|}

210601–210700 

|-bgcolor=#E9E9E9
| 210601 ||  || — || January 3, 2000 || Kitt Peak || Spacewatch || — || align=right | 1.6 km || 
|-id=602 bgcolor=#E9E9E9
| 210602 ||  || — || January 3, 2000 || Socorro || LINEAR || — || align=right | 2.1 km || 
|-id=603 bgcolor=#E9E9E9
| 210603 ||  || — || January 4, 2000 || Grasslands || J. McGaha || — || align=right | 2.1 km || 
|-id=604 bgcolor=#E9E9E9
| 210604 ||  || — || January 5, 2000 || Socorro || LINEAR || — || align=right | 2.1 km || 
|-id=605 bgcolor=#E9E9E9
| 210605 ||  || — || January 5, 2000 || Socorro || LINEAR || ADE || align=right | 2.7 km || 
|-id=606 bgcolor=#E9E9E9
| 210606 ||  || — || January 5, 2000 || Socorro || LINEAR || KRM || align=right | 4.1 km || 
|-id=607 bgcolor=#E9E9E9
| 210607 ||  || — || January 5, 2000 || Socorro || LINEAR || — || align=right | 2.8 km || 
|-id=608 bgcolor=#E9E9E9
| 210608 ||  || — || January 3, 2000 || Socorro || LINEAR || — || align=right | 1.6 km || 
|-id=609 bgcolor=#E9E9E9
| 210609 ||  || — || January 6, 2000 || Socorro || LINEAR || — || align=right | 1.2 km || 
|-id=610 bgcolor=#fefefe
| 210610 ||  || — || January 26, 2000 || Kitt Peak || Spacewatch || MAS || align=right data-sort-value="0.77" | 770 m || 
|-id=611 bgcolor=#E9E9E9
| 210611 ||  || — || January 26, 2000 || Kitt Peak || Spacewatch || — || align=right | 1.0 km || 
|-id=612 bgcolor=#E9E9E9
| 210612 ||  || — || February 2, 2000 || Socorro || LINEAR || — || align=right | 1.8 km || 
|-id=613 bgcolor=#E9E9E9
| 210613 ||  || — || February 8, 2000 || Kitt Peak || Spacewatch || — || align=right | 1.4 km || 
|-id=614 bgcolor=#E9E9E9
| 210614 ||  || — || February 4, 2000 || Socorro || LINEAR || — || align=right | 1.8 km || 
|-id=615 bgcolor=#E9E9E9
| 210615 ||  || — || February 26, 2000 || Kitt Peak || Spacewatch || — || align=right | 2.0 km || 
|-id=616 bgcolor=#E9E9E9
| 210616 ||  || — || February 29, 2000 || Socorro || LINEAR || ADE || align=right | 3.1 km || 
|-id=617 bgcolor=#E9E9E9
| 210617 ||  || — || February 29, 2000 || Socorro || LINEAR || — || align=right | 3.1 km || 
|-id=618 bgcolor=#E9E9E9
| 210618 ||  || — || February 29, 2000 || Socorro || LINEAR || — || align=right | 3.8 km || 
|-id=619 bgcolor=#E9E9E9
| 210619 ||  || — || February 29, 2000 || Socorro || LINEAR || CLO || align=right | 3.3 km || 
|-id=620 bgcolor=#E9E9E9
| 210620 ||  || — || February 27, 2000 || Kitt Peak || Spacewatch || — || align=right | 3.1 km || 
|-id=621 bgcolor=#E9E9E9
| 210621 ||  || — || March 3, 2000 || Kitt Peak || Spacewatch || — || align=right | 3.2 km || 
|-id=622 bgcolor=#E9E9E9
| 210622 ||  || — || March 4, 2000 || Socorro || LINEAR || HNS || align=right | 2.2 km || 
|-id=623 bgcolor=#E9E9E9
| 210623 ||  || — || March 4, 2000 || Socorro || LINEAR || — || align=right | 2.7 km || 
|-id=624 bgcolor=#E9E9E9
| 210624 ||  || — || March 8, 2000 || Socorro || LINEAR || — || align=right | 3.5 km || 
|-id=625 bgcolor=#E9E9E9
| 210625 ||  || — || March 9, 2000 || Socorro || LINEAR || — || align=right | 3.3 km || 
|-id=626 bgcolor=#E9E9E9
| 210626 ||  || — || March 12, 2000 || Kitt Peak || Spacewatch || — || align=right | 2.3 km || 
|-id=627 bgcolor=#E9E9E9
| 210627 ||  || — || March 14, 2000 || Kitt Peak || Spacewatch || — || align=right | 2.1 km || 
|-id=628 bgcolor=#E9E9E9
| 210628 ||  || — || March 5, 2000 || Haleakala || NEAT || — || align=right | 3.5 km || 
|-id=629 bgcolor=#E9E9E9
| 210629 ||  || — || March 6, 2000 || Haleakala || NEAT || — || align=right | 2.7 km || 
|-id=630 bgcolor=#E9E9E9
| 210630 ||  || — || March 3, 2000 || Socorro || LINEAR || — || align=right | 3.1 km || 
|-id=631 bgcolor=#E9E9E9
| 210631 ||  || — || March 1, 2000 || Catalina || CSS || — || align=right | 2.9 km || 
|-id=632 bgcolor=#E9E9E9
| 210632 ||  || — || March 29, 2000 || Socorro || LINEAR || — || align=right | 3.3 km || 
|-id=633 bgcolor=#E9E9E9
| 210633 ||  || — || March 29, 2000 || Socorro || LINEAR || ADE || align=right | 3.9 km || 
|-id=634 bgcolor=#E9E9E9
| 210634 ||  || — || March 29, 2000 || Socorro || LINEAR || — || align=right | 2.7 km || 
|-id=635 bgcolor=#FA8072
| 210635 ||  || — || April 4, 2000 || Anderson Mesa || LONEOS || — || align=right | 1.7 km || 
|-id=636 bgcolor=#E9E9E9
| 210636 ||  || — || April 5, 2000 || Socorro || LINEAR || — || align=right | 2.1 km || 
|-id=637 bgcolor=#E9E9E9
| 210637 ||  || — || April 5, 2000 || Socorro || LINEAR || ADE || align=right | 4.3 km || 
|-id=638 bgcolor=#E9E9E9
| 210638 ||  || — || April 5, 2000 || Socorro || LINEAR || RAF || align=right | 1.2 km || 
|-id=639 bgcolor=#E9E9E9
| 210639 ||  || — || April 5, 2000 || Socorro || LINEAR || — || align=right | 3.2 km || 
|-id=640 bgcolor=#E9E9E9
| 210640 ||  || — || April 5, 2000 || Socorro || LINEAR || — || align=right | 2.0 km || 
|-id=641 bgcolor=#E9E9E9
| 210641 ||  || — || April 8, 2000 || Socorro || LINEAR || — || align=right | 2.9 km || 
|-id=642 bgcolor=#E9E9E9
| 210642 ||  || — || April 14, 2000 || Prescott || P. G. Comba || POS || align=right | 3.6 km || 
|-id=643 bgcolor=#E9E9E9
| 210643 ||  || — || April 5, 2000 || Socorro || LINEAR || HEN || align=right | 4.0 km || 
|-id=644 bgcolor=#E9E9E9
| 210644 ||  || — || April 27, 2000 || Socorro || LINEAR || — || align=right | 4.7 km || 
|-id=645 bgcolor=#E9E9E9
| 210645 ||  || — || April 29, 2000 || Kitt Peak || Spacewatch || — || align=right | 3.0 km || 
|-id=646 bgcolor=#E9E9E9
| 210646 ||  || — || April 30, 2000 || Socorro || LINEAR || — || align=right | 2.7 km || 
|-id=647 bgcolor=#E9E9E9
| 210647 ||  || — || April 25, 2000 || Anderson Mesa || LONEOS || DOR || align=right | 5.0 km || 
|-id=648 bgcolor=#E9E9E9
| 210648 ||  || — || April 27, 2000 || Socorro || LINEAR || PAE || align=right | 3.4 km || 
|-id=649 bgcolor=#E9E9E9
| 210649 ||  || — || April 28, 2000 || Anderson Mesa || LONEOS || — || align=right | 4.8 km || 
|-id=650 bgcolor=#E9E9E9
| 210650 ||  || — || May 4, 2000 || Socorro || LINEAR || — || align=right | 3.9 km || 
|-id=651 bgcolor=#E9E9E9
| 210651 ||  || — || May 5, 2000 || Kitt Peak || Spacewatch || WIT || align=right | 1.6 km || 
|-id=652 bgcolor=#E9E9E9
| 210652 ||  || — || May 6, 2000 || Kitt Peak || Spacewatch || AGN || align=right | 1.9 km || 
|-id=653 bgcolor=#E9E9E9
| 210653 ||  || — || May 28, 2000 || Socorro || LINEAR || — || align=right | 4.4 km || 
|-id=654 bgcolor=#E9E9E9
| 210654 ||  || — || May 28, 2000 || Socorro || LINEAR || — || align=right | 3.4 km || 
|-id=655 bgcolor=#fefefe
| 210655 ||  || — || July 4, 2000 || Kitt Peak || Spacewatch || — || align=right | 1.2 km || 
|-id=656 bgcolor=#fefefe
| 210656 ||  || — || July 23, 2000 || Socorro || LINEAR || — || align=right | 1.4 km || 
|-id=657 bgcolor=#d6d6d6
| 210657 ||  || — || July 30, 2000 || Socorro || LINEAR || — || align=right | 4.8 km || 
|-id=658 bgcolor=#fefefe
| 210658 ||  || — || August 1, 2000 || Socorro || LINEAR || V || align=right data-sort-value="0.89" | 890 m || 
|-id=659 bgcolor=#fefefe
| 210659 ||  || — || August 24, 2000 || Socorro || LINEAR || — || align=right data-sort-value="0.90" | 900 m || 
|-id=660 bgcolor=#fefefe
| 210660 ||  || — || August 25, 2000 || Socorro || LINEAR || FLO || align=right | 1.2 km || 
|-id=661 bgcolor=#fefefe
| 210661 ||  || — || August 26, 2000 || Ondřejov || P. Kušnirák, P. Pravec || FLO || align=right | 1.0 km || 
|-id=662 bgcolor=#fefefe
| 210662 ||  || — || August 26, 2000 || Socorro || LINEAR || — || align=right | 1.3 km || 
|-id=663 bgcolor=#fefefe
| 210663 ||  || — || August 28, 2000 || Socorro || LINEAR || — || align=right | 1.0 km || 
|-id=664 bgcolor=#fefefe
| 210664 ||  || — || August 28, 2000 || Socorro || LINEAR || V || align=right | 1.0 km || 
|-id=665 bgcolor=#fefefe
| 210665 ||  || — || August 24, 2000 || Socorro || LINEAR || — || align=right | 1.2 km || 
|-id=666 bgcolor=#d6d6d6
| 210666 ||  || — || August 26, 2000 || Socorro || LINEAR || HYG || align=right | 5.3 km || 
|-id=667 bgcolor=#fefefe
| 210667 ||  || — || August 28, 2000 || Socorro || LINEAR || — || align=right | 1.3 km || 
|-id=668 bgcolor=#fefefe
| 210668 ||  || — || August 28, 2000 || Socorro || LINEAR || — || align=right | 1.3 km || 
|-id=669 bgcolor=#FA8072
| 210669 ||  || — || August 28, 2000 || Socorro || LINEAR || — || align=right | 1.5 km || 
|-id=670 bgcolor=#fefefe
| 210670 ||  || — || August 31, 2000 || Socorro || LINEAR || — || align=right | 1.2 km || 
|-id=671 bgcolor=#fefefe
| 210671 ||  || — || August 31, 2000 || Socorro || LINEAR || — || align=right data-sort-value="0.98" | 980 m || 
|-id=672 bgcolor=#d6d6d6
| 210672 ||  || — || August 26, 2000 || Socorro || LINEAR || — || align=right | 5.5 km || 
|-id=673 bgcolor=#fefefe
| 210673 ||  || — || August 29, 2000 || Socorro || LINEAR || — || align=right | 1.0 km || 
|-id=674 bgcolor=#fefefe
| 210674 ||  || — || August 31, 2000 || Socorro || LINEAR || — || align=right | 1.2 km || 
|-id=675 bgcolor=#d6d6d6
| 210675 ||  || — || August 31, 2000 || Socorro || LINEAR || EUP || align=right | 7.2 km || 
|-id=676 bgcolor=#fefefe
| 210676 ||  || — || August 31, 2000 || Socorro || LINEAR || NYS || align=right | 1.1 km || 
|-id=677 bgcolor=#d6d6d6
| 210677 ||  || — || September 1, 2000 || Socorro || LINEAR || — || align=right | 5.5 km || 
|-id=678 bgcolor=#fefefe
| 210678 ||  || — || September 3, 2000 || Socorro || LINEAR || — || align=right | 2.3 km || 
|-id=679 bgcolor=#E9E9E9
| 210679 ||  || — || September 3, 2000 || Socorro || LINEAR || — || align=right | 4.3 km || 
|-id=680 bgcolor=#fefefe
| 210680 ||  || — || September 1, 2000 || Socorro || LINEAR || — || align=right | 3.7 km || 
|-id=681 bgcolor=#d6d6d6
| 210681 ||  || — || September 2, 2000 || Socorro || LINEAR || — || align=right | 5.7 km || 
|-id=682 bgcolor=#E9E9E9
| 210682 ||  || — || September 8, 2000 || Kitt Peak || Spacewatch || — || align=right | 3.2 km || 
|-id=683 bgcolor=#d6d6d6
| 210683 ||  || — || September 2, 2000 || Anderson Mesa || LONEOS || — || align=right | 2.4 km || 
|-id=684 bgcolor=#fefefe
| 210684 ||  || — || September 3, 2000 || Socorro || LINEAR || FLO || align=right | 1.2 km || 
|-id=685 bgcolor=#fefefe
| 210685 ||  || — || September 3, 2000 || Socorro || LINEAR || — || align=right | 1.1 km || 
|-id=686 bgcolor=#d6d6d6
| 210686 Scottnorris ||  ||  || September 3, 2000 || Apache Point || SDSS || EOS || align=right | 2.8 km || 
|-id=687 bgcolor=#d6d6d6
| 210687 || 2000 SO || — || September 19, 2000 || Kitt Peak || Spacewatch || — || align=right | 5.7 km || 
|-id=688 bgcolor=#d6d6d6
| 210688 ||  || — || September 23, 2000 || Socorro || LINEAR || EUP || align=right | 6.2 km || 
|-id=689 bgcolor=#fefefe
| 210689 ||  || — || September 24, 2000 || Socorro || LINEAR || — || align=right | 1.5 km || 
|-id=690 bgcolor=#fefefe
| 210690 ||  || — || September 24, 2000 || Socorro || LINEAR || — || align=right | 1.1 km || 
|-id=691 bgcolor=#fefefe
| 210691 ||  || — || September 24, 2000 || Socorro || LINEAR || — || align=right data-sort-value="0.96" | 960 m || 
|-id=692 bgcolor=#fefefe
| 210692 ||  || — || September 24, 2000 || Socorro || LINEAR || V || align=right data-sort-value="0.95" | 950 m || 
|-id=693 bgcolor=#fefefe
| 210693 ||  || — || September 24, 2000 || Socorro || LINEAR || — || align=right | 1.3 km || 
|-id=694 bgcolor=#d6d6d6
| 210694 ||  || — || September 24, 2000 || Socorro || LINEAR || EUP || align=right | 6.6 km || 
|-id=695 bgcolor=#d6d6d6
| 210695 ||  || — || September 24, 2000 || Socorro || LINEAR || — || align=right | 5.7 km || 
|-id=696 bgcolor=#d6d6d6
| 210696 ||  || — || September 24, 2000 || Socorro || LINEAR || — || align=right | 6.5 km || 
|-id=697 bgcolor=#d6d6d6
| 210697 ||  || — || September 24, 2000 || Socorro || LINEAR || — || align=right | 6.5 km || 
|-id=698 bgcolor=#d6d6d6
| 210698 ||  || — || September 23, 2000 || Socorro || LINEAR || — || align=right | 6.3 km || 
|-id=699 bgcolor=#fefefe
| 210699 ||  || — || September 24, 2000 || Socorro || LINEAR || NYS || align=right data-sort-value="0.87" | 870 m || 
|-id=700 bgcolor=#fefefe
| 210700 ||  || — || September 24, 2000 || Socorro || LINEAR || NYS || align=right data-sort-value="0.79" | 790 m || 
|}

210701–210800 

|-bgcolor=#fefefe
| 210701 ||  || — || September 24, 2000 || Socorro || LINEAR || FLO || align=right | 1.2 km || 
|-id=702 bgcolor=#fefefe
| 210702 ||  || — || September 24, 2000 || Socorro || LINEAR || V || align=right | 1.1 km || 
|-id=703 bgcolor=#fefefe
| 210703 ||  || — || September 23, 2000 || Socorro || LINEAR || — || align=right | 1.3 km || 
|-id=704 bgcolor=#d6d6d6
| 210704 ||  || — || September 24, 2000 || Socorro || LINEAR || — || align=right | 4.1 km || 
|-id=705 bgcolor=#FA8072
| 210705 ||  || — || September 24, 2000 || Socorro || LINEAR || — || align=right | 1.5 km || 
|-id=706 bgcolor=#fefefe
| 210706 ||  || — || September 27, 2000 || Socorro || LINEAR || — || align=right | 1.2 km || 
|-id=707 bgcolor=#fefefe
| 210707 ||  || — || September 27, 2000 || Kitt Peak || Spacewatch || ERI || align=right | 2.5 km || 
|-id=708 bgcolor=#FA8072
| 210708 ||  || — || September 28, 2000 || Socorro || LINEAR || H || align=right data-sort-value="0.85" | 850 m || 
|-id=709 bgcolor=#d6d6d6
| 210709 ||  || — || September 23, 2000 || Kitt Peak || Spacewatch || EMA || align=right | 4.9 km || 
|-id=710 bgcolor=#fefefe
| 210710 ||  || — || September 24, 2000 || Socorro || LINEAR || — || align=right | 1.1 km || 
|-id=711 bgcolor=#d6d6d6
| 210711 ||  || — || September 24, 2000 || Socorro || LINEAR || URS || align=right | 5.9 km || 
|-id=712 bgcolor=#fefefe
| 210712 ||  || — || September 24, 2000 || Socorro || LINEAR || — || align=right | 1.1 km || 
|-id=713 bgcolor=#fefefe
| 210713 ||  || — || September 24, 2000 || Socorro || LINEAR || MAS || align=right data-sort-value="0.94" | 940 m || 
|-id=714 bgcolor=#d6d6d6
| 210714 ||  || — || September 25, 2000 || Socorro || LINEAR || 7:4 || align=right | 8.0 km || 
|-id=715 bgcolor=#d6d6d6
| 210715 ||  || — || September 26, 2000 || Socorro || LINEAR || HYG || align=right | 4.0 km || 
|-id=716 bgcolor=#E9E9E9
| 210716 ||  || — || September 24, 2000 || Socorro || LINEAR || — || align=right | 3.2 km || 
|-id=717 bgcolor=#fefefe
| 210717 ||  || — || September 24, 2000 || Socorro || LINEAR || — || align=right | 1.1 km || 
|-id=718 bgcolor=#d6d6d6
| 210718 ||  || — || September 24, 2000 || Socorro || LINEAR || 7:4 || align=right | 5.2 km || 
|-id=719 bgcolor=#fefefe
| 210719 ||  || — || September 30, 2000 || Socorro || LINEAR || PHO || align=right | 1.5 km || 
|-id=720 bgcolor=#d6d6d6
| 210720 ||  || — || September 24, 2000 || Socorro || LINEAR || — || align=right | 5.2 km || 
|-id=721 bgcolor=#fefefe
| 210721 ||  || — || September 28, 2000 || Socorro || LINEAR || — || align=right | 1.5 km || 
|-id=722 bgcolor=#fefefe
| 210722 ||  || — || September 30, 2000 || Socorro || LINEAR || FLO || align=right | 1.1 km || 
|-id=723 bgcolor=#fefefe
| 210723 ||  || — || September 30, 2000 || Socorro || LINEAR || FLO || align=right | 1.0 km || 
|-id=724 bgcolor=#d6d6d6
| 210724 ||  || — || September 26, 2000 || Haleakala || NEAT || — || align=right | 3.6 km || 
|-id=725 bgcolor=#fefefe
| 210725 ||  || — || September 26, 2000 || Socorro || LINEAR || — || align=right | 1.2 km || 
|-id=726 bgcolor=#d6d6d6
| 210726 ||  || — || September 25, 2000 || Kitt Peak || Spacewatch || — || align=right | 5.4 km || 
|-id=727 bgcolor=#fefefe
| 210727 ||  || — || September 20, 2000 || Socorro || LINEAR || — || align=right data-sort-value="0.95" | 950 m || 
|-id=728 bgcolor=#d6d6d6
| 210728 ||  || — || October 1, 2000 || Socorro || LINEAR || HYG || align=right | 3.4 km || 
|-id=729 bgcolor=#d6d6d6
| 210729 ||  || — || October 1, 2000 || Socorro || LINEAR || — || align=right | 5.0 km || 
|-id=730 bgcolor=#fefefe
| 210730 ||  || — || October 1, 2000 || Socorro || LINEAR || — || align=right | 1.0 km || 
|-id=731 bgcolor=#d6d6d6
| 210731 ||  || — || October 1, 2000 || Socorro || LINEAR || — || align=right | 5.8 km || 
|-id=732 bgcolor=#fefefe
| 210732 ||  || — || October 1, 2000 || Socorro || LINEAR || NYS || align=right | 1.00 km || 
|-id=733 bgcolor=#d6d6d6
| 210733 ||  || — || October 2, 2000 || Socorro || LINEAR || EOS || align=right | 3.0 km || 
|-id=734 bgcolor=#fefefe
| 210734 ||  || — || October 6, 2000 || Anderson Mesa || LONEOS || — || align=right | 1.4 km || 
|-id=735 bgcolor=#fefefe
| 210735 ||  || — || October 1, 2000 || Socorro || LINEAR || FLO || align=right | 1.00 km || 
|-id=736 bgcolor=#fefefe
| 210736 ||  || — || October 1, 2000 || Socorro || LINEAR || FLO || align=right data-sort-value="0.89" | 890 m || 
|-id=737 bgcolor=#fefefe
| 210737 ||  || — || October 21, 2000 || Višnjan Observatory || K. Korlević || — || align=right | 1.2 km || 
|-id=738 bgcolor=#fefefe
| 210738 ||  || — || October 27, 2000 || Kitt Peak || Spacewatch || — || align=right data-sort-value="0.92" | 920 m || 
|-id=739 bgcolor=#fefefe
| 210739 ||  || — || October 24, 2000 || Socorro || LINEAR || NYS || align=right data-sort-value="0.91" | 910 m || 
|-id=740 bgcolor=#fefefe
| 210740 ||  || — || October 24, 2000 || Socorro || LINEAR || NYS || align=right data-sort-value="0.92" | 920 m || 
|-id=741 bgcolor=#fefefe
| 210741 ||  || — || October 25, 2000 || Socorro || LINEAR || NYS || align=right data-sort-value="0.79" | 790 m || 
|-id=742 bgcolor=#fefefe
| 210742 ||  || — || October 25, 2000 || Socorro || LINEAR || — || align=right | 1.9 km || 
|-id=743 bgcolor=#fefefe
| 210743 ||  || — || October 25, 2000 || Socorro || LINEAR || ERI || align=right | 2.2 km || 
|-id=744 bgcolor=#FA8072
| 210744 ||  || — || October 31, 2000 || Socorro || LINEAR || — || align=right | 1.4 km || 
|-id=745 bgcolor=#fefefe
| 210745 ||  || — || October 25, 2000 || Socorro || LINEAR || FLO || align=right | 1.1 km || 
|-id=746 bgcolor=#d6d6d6
| 210746 ||  || — || October 25, 2000 || Socorro || LINEAR || THB || align=right | 6.8 km || 
|-id=747 bgcolor=#d6d6d6
| 210747 ||  || — || October 30, 2000 || Socorro || LINEAR || — || align=right | 4.7 km || 
|-id=748 bgcolor=#fefefe
| 210748 ||  || — || October 25, 2000 || Socorro || LINEAR || NYS || align=right data-sort-value="0.96" | 960 m || 
|-id=749 bgcolor=#fefefe
| 210749 ||  || — || November 1, 2000 || Socorro || LINEAR || NYS || align=right data-sort-value="0.87" | 870 m || 
|-id=750 bgcolor=#fefefe
| 210750 ||  || — || November 1, 2000 || Socorro || LINEAR || — || align=right | 1.3 km || 
|-id=751 bgcolor=#fefefe
| 210751 ||  || — || November 1, 2000 || Socorro || LINEAR || FLO || align=right | 1.2 km || 
|-id=752 bgcolor=#fefefe
| 210752 ||  || — || November 1, 2000 || Socorro || LINEAR || ERI || align=right | 2.3 km || 
|-id=753 bgcolor=#fefefe
| 210753 ||  || — || November 3, 2000 || Socorro || LINEAR || FLO || align=right | 1.1 km || 
|-id=754 bgcolor=#fefefe
| 210754 ||  || — || November 3, 2000 || Socorro || LINEAR || — || align=right | 1.5 km || 
|-id=755 bgcolor=#fefefe
| 210755 ||  || — || November 20, 2000 || Socorro || LINEAR || ERI || align=right | 2.5 km || 
|-id=756 bgcolor=#fefefe
| 210756 ||  || — || November 21, 2000 || Socorro || LINEAR || V || align=right | 1.0 km || 
|-id=757 bgcolor=#fefefe
| 210757 ||  || — || November 25, 2000 || Socorro || LINEAR || — || align=right | 1.3 km || 
|-id=758 bgcolor=#fefefe
| 210758 ||  || — || November 20, 2000 || Socorro || LINEAR || V || align=right data-sort-value="0.89" | 890 m || 
|-id=759 bgcolor=#fefefe
| 210759 ||  || — || November 20, 2000 || Socorro || LINEAR || — || align=right | 1.3 km || 
|-id=760 bgcolor=#fefefe
| 210760 ||  || — || November 21, 2000 || Socorro || LINEAR || — || align=right | 2.1 km || 
|-id=761 bgcolor=#fefefe
| 210761 ||  || — || November 21, 2000 || Socorro || LINEAR || NYS || align=right data-sort-value="0.86" | 860 m || 
|-id=762 bgcolor=#fefefe
| 210762 ||  || — || November 21, 2000 || Socorro || LINEAR || — || align=right | 1.3 km || 
|-id=763 bgcolor=#fefefe
| 210763 ||  || — || November 20, 2000 || Socorro || LINEAR || — || align=right | 1.2 km || 
|-id=764 bgcolor=#FA8072
| 210764 ||  || — || November 19, 2000 || Socorro || LINEAR || — || align=right | 1.3 km || 
|-id=765 bgcolor=#fefefe
| 210765 ||  || — || November 20, 2000 || Anderson Mesa || LONEOS || — || align=right | 1.5 km || 
|-id=766 bgcolor=#fefefe
| 210766 ||  || — || November 18, 2000 || Anderson Mesa || LONEOS || — || align=right | 1.1 km || 
|-id=767 bgcolor=#E9E9E9
| 210767 ||  || — || December 4, 2000 || Socorro || LINEAR || — || align=right | 2.2 km || 
|-id=768 bgcolor=#fefefe
| 210768 ||  || — || December 4, 2000 || Uccle || T. Pauwels || NYS || align=right | 2.1 km || 
|-id=769 bgcolor=#fefefe
| 210769 ||  || — || December 30, 2000 || Socorro || LINEAR || — || align=right | 1.4 km || 
|-id=770 bgcolor=#fefefe
| 210770 ||  || — || December 16, 2000 || Kitt Peak || Spacewatch || NYS || align=right data-sort-value="0.92" | 920 m || 
|-id=771 bgcolor=#fefefe
| 210771 ||  || — || December 29, 2000 || Haleakala || NEAT || — || align=right | 1.3 km || 
|-id=772 bgcolor=#fefefe
| 210772 ||  || — || January 2, 2001 || Socorro || LINEAR || — || align=right | 1.1 km || 
|-id=773 bgcolor=#fefefe
| 210773 ||  || — || January 4, 2001 || Socorro || LINEAR || H || align=right data-sort-value="0.83" | 830 m || 
|-id=774 bgcolor=#fefefe
| 210774 ||  || — || January 4, 2001 || Socorro || LINEAR || — || align=right | 2.3 km || 
|-id=775 bgcolor=#FA8072
| 210775 ||  || — || January 3, 2001 || Socorro || LINEAR || H || align=right | 1.5 km || 
|-id=776 bgcolor=#fefefe
| 210776 ||  || — || January 20, 2001 || Socorro || LINEAR || — || align=right | 1.6 km || 
|-id=777 bgcolor=#fefefe
| 210777 ||  || — || January 20, 2001 || Socorro || LINEAR || NYS || align=right data-sort-value="0.98" | 980 m || 
|-id=778 bgcolor=#fefefe
| 210778 ||  || — || January 21, 2001 || Socorro || LINEAR || NYS || align=right | 1.1 km || 
|-id=779 bgcolor=#E9E9E9
| 210779 ||  || — || January 21, 2001 || Socorro || LINEAR || EUN || align=right | 2.0 km || 
|-id=780 bgcolor=#fefefe
| 210780 ||  || — || January 21, 2001 || Socorro || LINEAR || NYS || align=right | 3.0 km || 
|-id=781 bgcolor=#fefefe
| 210781 ||  || — || February 1, 2001 || Anderson Mesa || LONEOS || — || align=right | 1.4 km || 
|-id=782 bgcolor=#fefefe
| 210782 ||  || — || February 16, 2001 || Kitt Peak || Spacewatch || — || align=right | 1.5 km || 
|-id=783 bgcolor=#fefefe
| 210783 ||  || — || February 16, 2001 || Socorro || LINEAR || H || align=right data-sort-value="0.90" | 900 m || 
|-id=784 bgcolor=#E9E9E9
| 210784 ||  || — || February 17, 2001 || Socorro || LINEAR || — || align=right | 1.4 km || 
|-id=785 bgcolor=#fefefe
| 210785 ||  || — || February 19, 2001 || Socorro || LINEAR || — || align=right | 1.4 km || 
|-id=786 bgcolor=#fefefe
| 210786 ||  || — || February 19, 2001 || Socorro || LINEAR || — || align=right | 1.4 km || 
|-id=787 bgcolor=#fefefe
| 210787 ||  || — || February 16, 2001 || Kitt Peak || Spacewatch || — || align=right | 1.5 km || 
|-id=788 bgcolor=#fefefe
| 210788 ||  || — || February 22, 2001 || Kitt Peak || Spacewatch || V || align=right data-sort-value="0.96" | 960 m || 
|-id=789 bgcolor=#fefefe
| 210789 ||  || — || February 24, 2001 || Haleakala || NEAT || H || align=right data-sort-value="0.91" | 910 m || 
|-id=790 bgcolor=#fefefe
| 210790 ||  || — || February 17, 2001 || Socorro || LINEAR || — || align=right | 1.3 km || 
|-id=791 bgcolor=#fefefe
| 210791 ||  || — || March 2, 2001 || Anderson Mesa || LONEOS || — || align=right | 1.4 km || 
|-id=792 bgcolor=#fefefe
| 210792 ||  || — || March 2, 2001 || Haleakala || NEAT || — || align=right | 1.3 km || 
|-id=793 bgcolor=#fefefe
| 210793 ||  || — || March 14, 2001 || Socorro || LINEAR || H || align=right data-sort-value="0.89" | 890 m || 
|-id=794 bgcolor=#fefefe
| 210794 ||  || — || March 14, 2001 || Anderson Mesa || LONEOS || H || align=right data-sort-value="0.80" | 800 m || 
|-id=795 bgcolor=#fefefe
| 210795 || 2001 FL || — || March 16, 2001 || Socorro || LINEAR || H || align=right data-sort-value="0.89" | 890 m || 
|-id=796 bgcolor=#E9E9E9
| 210796 ||  || — || March 19, 2001 || Socorro || LINEAR || — || align=right | 1.8 km || 
|-id=797 bgcolor=#fefefe
| 210797 ||  || — || March 20, 2001 || Kitt Peak || Spacewatch || — || align=right | 1.3 km || 
|-id=798 bgcolor=#fefefe
| 210798 ||  || — || March 18, 2001 || Socorro || LINEAR || H || align=right | 1.4 km || 
|-id=799 bgcolor=#fefefe
| 210799 ||  || — || March 21, 2001 || Socorro || LINEAR || H || align=right | 1.5 km || 
|-id=800 bgcolor=#E9E9E9
| 210800 ||  || — || March 19, 2001 || Socorro || LINEAR || — || align=right | 3.6 km || 
|}

210801–210900 

|-bgcolor=#fefefe
| 210801 ||  || — || March 18, 2001 || Socorro || LINEAR || — || align=right data-sort-value="0.92" | 920 m || 
|-id=802 bgcolor=#fefefe
| 210802 ||  || — || March 21, 2001 || Anderson Mesa || LONEOS || H || align=right | 1.4 km || 
|-id=803 bgcolor=#fefefe
| 210803 ||  || — || March 19, 2001 || Socorro || LINEAR || H || align=right data-sort-value="0.96" | 960 m || 
|-id=804 bgcolor=#E9E9E9
| 210804 ||  || — || March 18, 2001 || Anderson Mesa || LONEOS || — || align=right | 2.5 km || 
|-id=805 bgcolor=#E9E9E9
| 210805 ||  || — || April 15, 2001 || Socorro || LINEAR || — || align=right | 2.0 km || 
|-id=806 bgcolor=#FA8072
| 210806 ||  || — || April 27, 2001 || Socorro || LINEAR || — || align=right | 1.7 km || 
|-id=807 bgcolor=#E9E9E9
| 210807 ||  || — || April 27, 2001 || Socorro || LINEAR || — || align=right | 4.2 km || 
|-id=808 bgcolor=#E9E9E9
| 210808 ||  || — || April 24, 2001 || Haleakala || NEAT || MAR || align=right | 1.8 km || 
|-id=809 bgcolor=#E9E9E9
| 210809 ||  || — || May 15, 2001 || Haleakala || NEAT || — || align=right | 1.9 km || 
|-id=810 bgcolor=#E9E9E9
| 210810 || 2001 KS || — || May 17, 2001 || Socorro || LINEAR || — || align=right | 1.7 km || 
|-id=811 bgcolor=#E9E9E9
| 210811 ||  || — || May 18, 2001 || Socorro || LINEAR || — || align=right | 1.8 km || 
|-id=812 bgcolor=#E9E9E9
| 210812 ||  || — || May 22, 2001 || Socorro || LINEAR || — || align=right | 1.7 km || 
|-id=813 bgcolor=#E9E9E9
| 210813 ||  || — || May 17, 2001 || Socorro || LINEAR || — || align=right | 1.5 km || 
|-id=814 bgcolor=#E9E9E9
| 210814 ||  || — || May 23, 2001 || Socorro || LINEAR || RAF || align=right | 1.6 km || 
|-id=815 bgcolor=#E9E9E9
| 210815 ||  || — || May 22, 2001 || Socorro || LINEAR || — || align=right | 1.7 km || 
|-id=816 bgcolor=#E9E9E9
| 210816 ||  || — || May 18, 2001 || Socorro || LINEAR || — || align=right | 2.4 km || 
|-id=817 bgcolor=#E9E9E9
| 210817 ||  || — || May 28, 2001 || Haleakala || NEAT || JUN || align=right | 2.2 km || 
|-id=818 bgcolor=#E9E9E9
| 210818 ||  || — || June 15, 2001 || Socorro || LINEAR || JUN || align=right | 1.9 km || 
|-id=819 bgcolor=#E9E9E9
| 210819 ||  || — || June 18, 2001 || Palomar || NEAT || — || align=right | 2.1 km || 
|-id=820 bgcolor=#E9E9E9
| 210820 ||  || — || July 13, 2001 || Palomar || NEAT || JUN || align=right | 1.1 km || 
|-id=821 bgcolor=#E9E9E9
| 210821 ||  || — || July 13, 2001 || Palomar || NEAT || MRX || align=right | 1.3 km || 
|-id=822 bgcolor=#E9E9E9
| 210822 ||  || — || July 14, 2001 || Haleakala || NEAT || — || align=right | 3.6 km || 
|-id=823 bgcolor=#d6d6d6
| 210823 ||  || — || July 14, 2001 || Haleakala || NEAT || — || align=right | 4.9 km || 
|-id=824 bgcolor=#E9E9E9
| 210824 ||  || — || July 12, 2001 || Palomar || NEAT || — || align=right | 4.6 km || 
|-id=825 bgcolor=#E9E9E9
| 210825 ||  || — || July 12, 2001 || Palomar || NEAT || — || align=right | 2.7 km || 
|-id=826 bgcolor=#E9E9E9
| 210826 ||  || — || July 17, 2001 || Haleakala || NEAT || — || align=right | 2.2 km || 
|-id=827 bgcolor=#d6d6d6
| 210827 ||  || — || July 19, 2001 || OCA-Anza || M. White, M. Collins || — || align=right | 4.0 km || 
|-id=828 bgcolor=#E9E9E9
| 210828 ||  || — || July 20, 2001 || Palomar || NEAT || — || align=right | 2.1 km || 
|-id=829 bgcolor=#E9E9E9
| 210829 ||  || — || July 16, 2001 || Anderson Mesa || LONEOS || — || align=right | 3.6 km || 
|-id=830 bgcolor=#E9E9E9
| 210830 ||  || — || July 21, 2001 || Palomar || NEAT || — || align=right | 2.8 km || 
|-id=831 bgcolor=#E9E9E9
| 210831 ||  || — || July 17, 2001 || Siding Spring || R. H. McNaught || BAR || align=right | 2.6 km || 
|-id=832 bgcolor=#d6d6d6
| 210832 ||  || — || August 9, 2001 || Palomar || NEAT || — || align=right | 5.2 km || 
|-id=833 bgcolor=#E9E9E9
| 210833 ||  || — || August 10, 2001 || Palomar || NEAT || DOR || align=right | 4.6 km || 
|-id=834 bgcolor=#d6d6d6
| 210834 ||  || — || August 11, 2001 || Haleakala || NEAT || TIR || align=right | 4.9 km || 
|-id=835 bgcolor=#d6d6d6
| 210835 ||  || — || August 11, 2001 || Palomar || NEAT || — || align=right | 5.3 km || 
|-id=836 bgcolor=#d6d6d6
| 210836 ||  || — || August 12, 2001 || Palomar || NEAT || BRA || align=right | 2.8 km || 
|-id=837 bgcolor=#E9E9E9
| 210837 ||  || — || August 13, 2001 || Palomar || NEAT || — || align=right | 2.8 km || 
|-id=838 bgcolor=#E9E9E9
| 210838 ||  || — || August 13, 2001 || Haleakala || NEAT || — || align=right | 3.2 km || 
|-id=839 bgcolor=#d6d6d6
| 210839 ||  || — || August 16, 2001 || Socorro || LINEAR || — || align=right | 5.5 km || 
|-id=840 bgcolor=#E9E9E9
| 210840 ||  || — || August 21, 2001 || Haleakala || NEAT || GEF || align=right | 1.8 km || 
|-id=841 bgcolor=#E9E9E9
| 210841 ||  || — || August 23, 2001 || Socorro || LINEAR || BRU || align=right | 7.0 km || 
|-id=842 bgcolor=#E9E9E9
| 210842 ||  || — || August 20, 2001 || Socorro || LINEAR || — || align=right | 1.6 km || 
|-id=843 bgcolor=#E9E9E9
| 210843 ||  || — || August 25, 2001 || Kitt Peak || Spacewatch || — || align=right | 2.2 km || 
|-id=844 bgcolor=#E9E9E9
| 210844 ||  || — || August 21, 2001 || Socorro || LINEAR || CLO || align=right | 3.5 km || 
|-id=845 bgcolor=#d6d6d6
| 210845 ||  || — || August 22, 2001 || Haleakala || NEAT || — || align=right | 3.9 km || 
|-id=846 bgcolor=#d6d6d6
| 210846 ||  || — || August 23, 2001 || Anderson Mesa || LONEOS || — || align=right | 3.5 km || 
|-id=847 bgcolor=#d6d6d6
| 210847 ||  || — || August 23, 2001 || Anderson Mesa || LONEOS || EOS || align=right | 2.2 km || 
|-id=848 bgcolor=#E9E9E9
| 210848 ||  || — || August 24, 2001 || Socorro || LINEAR || — || align=right | 2.1 km || 
|-id=849 bgcolor=#d6d6d6
| 210849 ||  || — || August 25, 2001 || Socorro || LINEAR || — || align=right | 3.3 km || 
|-id=850 bgcolor=#d6d6d6
| 210850 ||  || — || August 20, 2001 || Socorro || LINEAR || — || align=right | 4.1 km || 
|-id=851 bgcolor=#E9E9E9
| 210851 ||  || — || August 19, 2001 || Socorro || LINEAR || MRX || align=right | 1.6 km || 
|-id=852 bgcolor=#E9E9E9
| 210852 ||  || — || August 18, 2001 || Palomar || NEAT || — || align=right | 3.7 km || 
|-id=853 bgcolor=#E9E9E9
| 210853 ||  || — || August 16, 2001 || Socorro || LINEAR || — || align=right | 2.5 km || 
|-id=854 bgcolor=#E9E9E9
| 210854 ||  || — || August 20, 2001 || Cerro Tololo || M. W. Buie || — || align=right | 3.5 km || 
|-id=855 bgcolor=#d6d6d6
| 210855 ||  || — || September 7, 2001 || Socorro || LINEAR || CHA || align=right | 2.7 km || 
|-id=856 bgcolor=#d6d6d6
| 210856 ||  || — || September 7, 2001 || Socorro || LINEAR || — || align=right | 3.5 km || 
|-id=857 bgcolor=#E9E9E9
| 210857 ||  || — || September 8, 2001 || Socorro || LINEAR || AGN || align=right | 1.8 km || 
|-id=858 bgcolor=#d6d6d6
| 210858 ||  || — || September 11, 2001 || Socorro || LINEAR || HYG || align=right | 3.7 km || 
|-id=859 bgcolor=#d6d6d6
| 210859 ||  || — || September 11, 2001 || Socorro || LINEAR || — || align=right | 3.8 km || 
|-id=860 bgcolor=#d6d6d6
| 210860 ||  || — || September 11, 2001 || Socorro || LINEAR || KOR || align=right | 1.9 km || 
|-id=861 bgcolor=#d6d6d6
| 210861 ||  || — || September 12, 2001 || Goodricke-Pigott || R. A. Tucker || TIR || align=right | 4.2 km || 
|-id=862 bgcolor=#E9E9E9
| 210862 ||  || — || September 12, 2001 || Socorro || LINEAR || — || align=right | 2.1 km || 
|-id=863 bgcolor=#E9E9E9
| 210863 ||  || — || September 12, 2001 || Socorro || LINEAR || — || align=right | 3.7 km || 
|-id=864 bgcolor=#d6d6d6
| 210864 ||  || — || September 12, 2001 || Socorro || LINEAR || CHA || align=right | 3.3 km || 
|-id=865 bgcolor=#d6d6d6
| 210865 ||  || — || September 11, 2001 || Anderson Mesa || LONEOS || — || align=right | 4.2 km || 
|-id=866 bgcolor=#d6d6d6
| 210866 ||  || — || September 11, 2001 || Anderson Mesa || LONEOS || URS || align=right | 7.3 km || 
|-id=867 bgcolor=#E9E9E9
| 210867 ||  || — || September 12, 2001 || Socorro || LINEAR || HOF || align=right | 4.4 km || 
|-id=868 bgcolor=#d6d6d6
| 210868 ||  || — || September 12, 2001 || Socorro || LINEAR || KOR || align=right | 1.9 km || 
|-id=869 bgcolor=#E9E9E9
| 210869 ||  || — || September 12, 2001 || Socorro || LINEAR || NEM || align=right | 2.7 km || 
|-id=870 bgcolor=#E9E9E9
| 210870 ||  || — || September 12, 2001 || Socorro || LINEAR || — || align=right | 3.8 km || 
|-id=871 bgcolor=#d6d6d6
| 210871 ||  || — || September 12, 2001 || Socorro || LINEAR || — || align=right | 3.7 km || 
|-id=872 bgcolor=#E9E9E9
| 210872 ||  || — || September 12, 2001 || Socorro || LINEAR || — || align=right | 3.4 km || 
|-id=873 bgcolor=#d6d6d6
| 210873 ||  || — || September 12, 2001 || Socorro || LINEAR || KOR || align=right | 1.9 km || 
|-id=874 bgcolor=#d6d6d6
| 210874 ||  || — || September 12, 2001 || Kitt Peak || M. W. Buie || — || align=right | 3.5 km || 
|-id=875 bgcolor=#d6d6d6
| 210875 ||  || — || September 16, 2001 || Socorro || LINEAR || — || align=right | 4.1 km || 
|-id=876 bgcolor=#d6d6d6
| 210876 ||  || — || September 16, 2001 || Socorro || LINEAR || CHA || align=right | 2.6 km || 
|-id=877 bgcolor=#d6d6d6
| 210877 ||  || — || September 16, 2001 || Socorro || LINEAR || NAE || align=right | 5.2 km || 
|-id=878 bgcolor=#d6d6d6
| 210878 ||  || — || September 16, 2001 || Socorro || LINEAR || — || align=right | 3.8 km || 
|-id=879 bgcolor=#d6d6d6
| 210879 ||  || — || September 16, 2001 || Socorro || LINEAR || — || align=right | 4.3 km || 
|-id=880 bgcolor=#d6d6d6
| 210880 ||  || — || September 16, 2001 || Socorro || LINEAR || — || align=right | 3.6 km || 
|-id=881 bgcolor=#d6d6d6
| 210881 ||  || — || September 17, 2001 || Socorro || LINEAR || THM || align=right | 4.1 km || 
|-id=882 bgcolor=#fefefe
| 210882 ||  || — || September 17, 2001 || Socorro || LINEAR || — || align=right data-sort-value="0.95" | 950 m || 
|-id=883 bgcolor=#E9E9E9
| 210883 ||  || — || September 19, 2001 || Socorro || LINEAR || AGN || align=right | 1.7 km || 
|-id=884 bgcolor=#E9E9E9
| 210884 ||  || — || September 20, 2001 || Socorro || LINEAR || AGN || align=right | 1.8 km || 
|-id=885 bgcolor=#E9E9E9
| 210885 ||  || — || September 20, 2001 || Socorro || LINEAR || — || align=right | 2.4 km || 
|-id=886 bgcolor=#E9E9E9
| 210886 ||  || — || September 20, 2001 || Socorro || LINEAR || — || align=right | 3.4 km || 
|-id=887 bgcolor=#d6d6d6
| 210887 ||  || — || September 20, 2001 || Socorro || LINEAR || EOS || align=right | 2.0 km || 
|-id=888 bgcolor=#d6d6d6
| 210888 ||  || — || September 20, 2001 || Socorro || LINEAR || — || align=right | 3.8 km || 
|-id=889 bgcolor=#fefefe
| 210889 ||  || — || September 20, 2001 || Socorro || LINEAR || — || align=right | 1.2 km || 
|-id=890 bgcolor=#d6d6d6
| 210890 ||  || — || September 16, 2001 || Socorro || LINEAR || EOS || align=right | 2.5 km || 
|-id=891 bgcolor=#E9E9E9
| 210891 ||  || — || September 16, 2001 || Socorro || LINEAR || — || align=right | 4.0 km || 
|-id=892 bgcolor=#d6d6d6
| 210892 ||  || — || September 16, 2001 || Socorro || LINEAR || — || align=right | 3.5 km || 
|-id=893 bgcolor=#E9E9E9
| 210893 ||  || — || September 16, 2001 || Socorro || LINEAR || — || align=right | 3.2 km || 
|-id=894 bgcolor=#E9E9E9
| 210894 ||  || — || September 16, 2001 || Socorro || LINEAR || — || align=right | 2.4 km || 
|-id=895 bgcolor=#d6d6d6
| 210895 ||  || — || September 17, 2001 || Socorro || LINEAR || — || align=right | 4.4 km || 
|-id=896 bgcolor=#d6d6d6
| 210896 ||  || — || September 17, 2001 || Socorro || LINEAR || EUP || align=right | 7.6 km || 
|-id=897 bgcolor=#d6d6d6
| 210897 ||  || — || September 19, 2001 || Socorro || LINEAR || — || align=right | 4.0 km || 
|-id=898 bgcolor=#d6d6d6
| 210898 ||  || — || September 19, 2001 || Socorro || LINEAR || THM || align=right | 3.2 km || 
|-id=899 bgcolor=#d6d6d6
| 210899 ||  || — || September 16, 2001 || Socorro || LINEAR || — || align=right | 3.3 km || 
|-id=900 bgcolor=#d6d6d6
| 210900 ||  || — || September 16, 2001 || Socorro || LINEAR || FIR || align=right | 6.0 km || 
|}

210901–211000 

|-bgcolor=#E9E9E9
| 210901 ||  || — || September 19, 2001 || Socorro || LINEAR || HOF || align=right | 3.4 km || 
|-id=902 bgcolor=#d6d6d6
| 210902 ||  || — || September 19, 2001 || Socorro || LINEAR || THM || align=right | 3.6 km || 
|-id=903 bgcolor=#d6d6d6
| 210903 ||  || — || September 19, 2001 || Socorro || LINEAR || — || align=right | 3.0 km || 
|-id=904 bgcolor=#E9E9E9
| 210904 ||  || — || September 19, 2001 || Socorro || LINEAR || — || align=right | 2.8 km || 
|-id=905 bgcolor=#d6d6d6
| 210905 ||  || — || September 19, 2001 || Socorro || LINEAR || — || align=right | 4.2 km || 
|-id=906 bgcolor=#d6d6d6
| 210906 ||  || — || September 19, 2001 || Socorro || LINEAR || EMA || align=right | 4.6 km || 
|-id=907 bgcolor=#d6d6d6
| 210907 ||  || — || September 19, 2001 || Socorro || LINEAR || — || align=right | 3.4 km || 
|-id=908 bgcolor=#d6d6d6
| 210908 ||  || — || September 19, 2001 || Socorro || LINEAR || — || align=right | 4.7 km || 
|-id=909 bgcolor=#d6d6d6
| 210909 ||  || — || September 19, 2001 || Socorro || LINEAR || THM || align=right | 3.2 km || 
|-id=910 bgcolor=#d6d6d6
| 210910 ||  || — || September 19, 2001 || Socorro || LINEAR || — || align=right | 3.5 km || 
|-id=911 bgcolor=#d6d6d6
| 210911 ||  || — || September 19, 2001 || Socorro || LINEAR || HYG || align=right | 3.3 km || 
|-id=912 bgcolor=#d6d6d6
| 210912 ||  || — || September 19, 2001 || Socorro || LINEAR || — || align=right | 4.6 km || 
|-id=913 bgcolor=#d6d6d6
| 210913 ||  || — || September 19, 2001 || Socorro || LINEAR || EUP || align=right | 4.0 km || 
|-id=914 bgcolor=#d6d6d6
| 210914 ||  || — || September 19, 2001 || Socorro || LINEAR || — || align=right | 4.8 km || 
|-id=915 bgcolor=#E9E9E9
| 210915 ||  || — || September 19, 2001 || Socorro || LINEAR || — || align=right | 2.2 km || 
|-id=916 bgcolor=#d6d6d6
| 210916 ||  || — || September 20, 2001 || Socorro || LINEAR || — || align=right | 2.7 km || 
|-id=917 bgcolor=#d6d6d6
| 210917 ||  || — || September 25, 2001 || Eskridge || G. Hug || — || align=right | 3.2 km || 
|-id=918 bgcolor=#E9E9E9
| 210918 ||  || — || September 19, 2001 || Kitt Peak || Spacewatch || — || align=right | 2.2 km || 
|-id=919 bgcolor=#d6d6d6
| 210919 ||  || — || September 20, 2001 || Socorro || LINEAR || — || align=right | 3.9 km || 
|-id=920 bgcolor=#d6d6d6
| 210920 ||  || — || September 21, 2001 || Socorro || LINEAR || — || align=right | 4.6 km || 
|-id=921 bgcolor=#d6d6d6
| 210921 ||  || — || September 18, 2001 || Anderson Mesa || LONEOS || — || align=right | 5.0 km || 
|-id=922 bgcolor=#d6d6d6
| 210922 ||  || — || September 20, 2001 || Socorro || LINEAR || TEL || align=right | 1.7 km || 
|-id=923 bgcolor=#d6d6d6
| 210923 ||  || — || September 20, 2001 || Socorro || LINEAR || — || align=right | 6.0 km || 
|-id=924 bgcolor=#d6d6d6
| 210924 ||  || — || September 25, 2001 || Socorro || LINEAR || EUP || align=right | 5.6 km || 
|-id=925 bgcolor=#d6d6d6
| 210925 ||  || — || October 8, 2001 || Palomar || NEAT || — || align=right | 4.1 km || 
|-id=926 bgcolor=#d6d6d6
| 210926 ||  || — || October 13, 2001 || Socorro || LINEAR || — || align=right | 3.9 km || 
|-id=927 bgcolor=#E9E9E9
| 210927 ||  || — || October 13, 2001 || Socorro || LINEAR || — || align=right | 2.4 km || 
|-id=928 bgcolor=#d6d6d6
| 210928 ||  || — || October 14, 2001 || Socorro || LINEAR || fast? || align=right | 3.2 km || 
|-id=929 bgcolor=#d6d6d6
| 210929 ||  || — || October 13, 2001 || Socorro || LINEAR || — || align=right | 6.4 km || 
|-id=930 bgcolor=#fefefe
| 210930 ||  || — || October 15, 2001 || Socorro || LINEAR || MAS || align=right data-sort-value="0.80" | 800 m || 
|-id=931 bgcolor=#d6d6d6
| 210931 ||  || — || October 12, 2001 || Haleakala || NEAT || — || align=right | 5.1 km || 
|-id=932 bgcolor=#d6d6d6
| 210932 ||  || — || October 11, 2001 || Palomar || NEAT || — || align=right | 3.1 km || 
|-id=933 bgcolor=#d6d6d6
| 210933 ||  || — || October 11, 2001 || Palomar || NEAT || — || align=right | 3.2 km || 
|-id=934 bgcolor=#d6d6d6
| 210934 ||  || — || October 13, 2001 || Socorro || LINEAR || — || align=right | 3.7 km || 
|-id=935 bgcolor=#d6d6d6
| 210935 ||  || — || October 15, 2001 || Socorro || LINEAR || — || align=right | 3.7 km || 
|-id=936 bgcolor=#d6d6d6
| 210936 ||  || — || October 14, 2001 || Socorro || LINEAR || — || align=right | 4.5 km || 
|-id=937 bgcolor=#d6d6d6
| 210937 ||  || — || October 14, 2001 || Socorro || LINEAR || — || align=right | 3.6 km || 
|-id=938 bgcolor=#d6d6d6
| 210938 ||  || — || October 14, 2001 || Socorro || LINEAR || CHA || align=right | 3.1 km || 
|-id=939 bgcolor=#d6d6d6
| 210939 Bödök ||  ||  || October 10, 2001 || Palomar || NEAT || HYG || align=right | 3.9 km || 
|-id=940 bgcolor=#E9E9E9
| 210940 ||  || — || October 11, 2001 || Socorro || LINEAR || — || align=right | 2.8 km || 
|-id=941 bgcolor=#d6d6d6
| 210941 ||  || — || October 11, 2001 || Socorro || LINEAR || — || align=right | 5.0 km || 
|-id=942 bgcolor=#d6d6d6
| 210942 ||  || — || October 12, 2001 || Campo Imperatore || CINEOS || — || align=right | 4.0 km || 
|-id=943 bgcolor=#d6d6d6
| 210943 ||  || — || October 15, 2001 || Socorro || LINEAR || EUP || align=right | 6.5 km || 
|-id=944 bgcolor=#d6d6d6
| 210944 ||  || — || October 15, 2001 || Socorro || LINEAR || — || align=right | 5.9 km || 
|-id=945 bgcolor=#d6d6d6
| 210945 ||  || — || October 15, 2001 || Socorro || LINEAR || — || align=right | 5.6 km || 
|-id=946 bgcolor=#d6d6d6
| 210946 ||  || — || October 10, 2001 || Kitt Peak || Spacewatch || EOS || align=right | 2.7 km || 
|-id=947 bgcolor=#d6d6d6
| 210947 ||  || — || October 11, 2001 || Socorro || LINEAR || EOS || align=right | 3.5 km || 
|-id=948 bgcolor=#d6d6d6
| 210948 ||  || — || October 17, 2001 || Socorro || LINEAR || — || align=right | 5.0 km || 
|-id=949 bgcolor=#E9E9E9
| 210949 ||  || — || October 17, 2001 || Kitt Peak || Spacewatch || — || align=right | 3.0 km || 
|-id=950 bgcolor=#d6d6d6
| 210950 ||  || — || October 17, 2001 || Socorro || LINEAR || EOS || align=right | 4.4 km || 
|-id=951 bgcolor=#fefefe
| 210951 ||  || — || October 17, 2001 || Socorro || LINEAR || — || align=right data-sort-value="0.86" | 860 m || 
|-id=952 bgcolor=#d6d6d6
| 210952 ||  || — || October 17, 2001 || Socorro || LINEAR || — || align=right | 7.4 km || 
|-id=953 bgcolor=#d6d6d6
| 210953 ||  || — || October 17, 2001 || Socorro || LINEAR || — || align=right | 3.9 km || 
|-id=954 bgcolor=#E9E9E9
| 210954 ||  || — || October 17, 2001 || Socorro || LINEAR || HOF || align=right | 3.4 km || 
|-id=955 bgcolor=#d6d6d6
| 210955 ||  || — || October 20, 2001 || Socorro || LINEAR || HYG || align=right | 3.9 km || 
|-id=956 bgcolor=#d6d6d6
| 210956 ||  || — || October 18, 2001 || Palomar || NEAT || — || align=right | 5.4 km || 
|-id=957 bgcolor=#d6d6d6
| 210957 ||  || — || October 20, 2001 || Socorro || LINEAR || — || align=right | 3.5 km || 
|-id=958 bgcolor=#d6d6d6
| 210958 ||  || — || October 20, 2001 || Socorro || LINEAR || — || align=right | 3.7 km || 
|-id=959 bgcolor=#d6d6d6
| 210959 ||  || — || October 18, 2001 || Socorro || LINEAR || — || align=right | 3.8 km || 
|-id=960 bgcolor=#d6d6d6
| 210960 ||  || — || October 18, 2001 || Socorro || LINEAR || — || align=right | 3.4 km || 
|-id=961 bgcolor=#d6d6d6
| 210961 ||  || — || October 23, 2001 || Socorro || LINEAR || KOR || align=right | 2.1 km || 
|-id=962 bgcolor=#fefefe
| 210962 ||  || — || October 23, 2001 || Socorro || LINEAR || — || align=right data-sort-value="0.87" | 870 m || 
|-id=963 bgcolor=#d6d6d6
| 210963 ||  || — || October 23, 2001 || Socorro || LINEAR || — || align=right | 4.5 km || 
|-id=964 bgcolor=#d6d6d6
| 210964 ||  || — || October 18, 2001 || Palomar || NEAT || — || align=right | 5.2 km || 
|-id=965 bgcolor=#d6d6d6
| 210965 ||  || — || October 26, 2001 || Palomar || NEAT || — || align=right | 3.8 km || 
|-id=966 bgcolor=#d6d6d6
| 210966 ||  || — || October 18, 2001 || Palomar || NEAT || — || align=right | 3.7 km || 
|-id=967 bgcolor=#d6d6d6
| 210967 ||  || — || October 20, 2001 || Kitt Peak || Spacewatch || — || align=right | 3.3 km || 
|-id=968 bgcolor=#d6d6d6
| 210968 ||  || — || October 21, 2001 || Socorro || LINEAR || — || align=right | 4.4 km || 
|-id=969 bgcolor=#fefefe
| 210969 || 2001 VH || — || November 5, 2001 || Needville || Needville Obs. || — || align=right data-sort-value="0.91" | 910 m || 
|-id=970 bgcolor=#fefefe
| 210970 ||  || — || November 9, 2001 || Socorro || LINEAR || MAS || align=right | 1.1 km || 
|-id=971 bgcolor=#fefefe
| 210971 ||  || — || November 9, 2001 || Socorro || LINEAR || — || align=right data-sort-value="0.87" | 870 m || 
|-id=972 bgcolor=#d6d6d6
| 210972 ||  || — || November 10, 2001 || Socorro || LINEAR || — || align=right | 4.2 km || 
|-id=973 bgcolor=#d6d6d6
| 210973 ||  || — || November 10, 2001 || Socorro || LINEAR || — || align=right | 4.6 km || 
|-id=974 bgcolor=#d6d6d6
| 210974 ||  || — || November 10, 2001 || Socorro || LINEAR || TIR || align=right | 3.9 km || 
|-id=975 bgcolor=#E9E9E9
| 210975 ||  || — || November 10, 2001 || Socorro || LINEAR || DOR || align=right | 4.0 km || 
|-id=976 bgcolor=#d6d6d6
| 210976 ||  || — || November 11, 2001 || Socorro || LINEAR || — || align=right | 5.4 km || 
|-id=977 bgcolor=#d6d6d6
| 210977 ||  || — || November 10, 2001 || Socorro || LINEAR || — || align=right | 3.8 km || 
|-id=978 bgcolor=#d6d6d6
| 210978 ||  || — || November 10, 2001 || Socorro || LINEAR || — || align=right | 5.0 km || 
|-id=979 bgcolor=#d6d6d6
| 210979 ||  || — || November 12, 2001 || Socorro || LINEAR || VER || align=right | 3.8 km || 
|-id=980 bgcolor=#d6d6d6
| 210980 ||  || — || November 12, 2001 || Socorro || LINEAR || — || align=right | 5.5 km || 
|-id=981 bgcolor=#fefefe
| 210981 ||  || — || November 12, 2001 || Socorro || LINEAR || — || align=right data-sort-value="0.81" | 810 m || 
|-id=982 bgcolor=#d6d6d6
| 210982 ||  || — || November 14, 2001 || Kitt Peak || Spacewatch || HYG || align=right | 3.4 km || 
|-id=983 bgcolor=#d6d6d6
| 210983 Wadeparker ||  ||  || November 11, 2001 || Apache Point || SDSS || — || align=right | 5.3 km || 
|-id=984 bgcolor=#E9E9E9
| 210984 || 2001 WM || — || November 16, 2001 || Kitt Peak || Spacewatch || — || align=right | 3.7 km || 
|-id=985 bgcolor=#d6d6d6
| 210985 ||  || — || November 18, 2001 || Socorro || LINEAR || EOS || align=right | 2.8 km || 
|-id=986 bgcolor=#d6d6d6
| 210986 ||  || — || November 19, 2001 || Socorro || LINEAR || — || align=right | 3.3 km || 
|-id=987 bgcolor=#E9E9E9
| 210987 ||  || — || November 19, 2001 || Socorro || LINEAR || DOR || align=right | 3.3 km || 
|-id=988 bgcolor=#d6d6d6
| 210988 ||  || — || November 19, 2001 || Socorro || LINEAR || EOS || align=right | 2.5 km || 
|-id=989 bgcolor=#d6d6d6
| 210989 ||  || — || November 19, 2001 || Socorro || LINEAR || EOS || align=right | 3.2 km || 
|-id=990 bgcolor=#d6d6d6
| 210990 ||  || — || November 20, 2001 || Socorro || LINEAR || EOS || align=right | 2.3 km || 
|-id=991 bgcolor=#d6d6d6
| 210991 ||  || — || November 21, 2001 || Socorro || LINEAR || ARM || align=right | 6.3 km || 
|-id=992 bgcolor=#d6d6d6
| 210992 ||  || — || November 21, 2001 || Socorro || LINEAR || — || align=right | 6.0 km || 
|-id=993 bgcolor=#d6d6d6
| 210993 ||  || — || December 9, 2001 || Socorro || LINEAR || — || align=right | 5.4 km || 
|-id=994 bgcolor=#d6d6d6
| 210994 ||  || — || December 9, 2001 || Socorro || LINEAR || HYG || align=right | 3.6 km || 
|-id=995 bgcolor=#fefefe
| 210995 ||  || — || December 9, 2001 || Socorro || LINEAR || — || align=right | 1.0 km || 
|-id=996 bgcolor=#fefefe
| 210996 ||  || — || December 9, 2001 || Socorro || LINEAR || — || align=right | 1.2 km || 
|-id=997 bgcolor=#fefefe
| 210997 Guenat ||  ||  || December 14, 2001 || Vicques || M. Ory || — || align=right | 1.9 km || 
|-id=998 bgcolor=#fefefe
| 210998 ||  || — || December 9, 2001 || Socorro || LINEAR || — || align=right | 1.6 km || 
|-id=999 bgcolor=#d6d6d6
| 210999 ||  || — || December 10, 2001 || Socorro || LINEAR || — || align=right | 4.8 km || 
|-id=000 bgcolor=#d6d6d6
| 211000 ||  || — || December 14, 2001 || Socorro || LINEAR || — || align=right | 3.9 km || 
|}

References

External links 
 Discovery Circumstances: Numbered Minor Planets (210001)–(215000) (IAU Minor Planet Center)

0210